

218001–218100 

|-bgcolor=#E9E9E9
| 218001 ||  || — || December 11, 2001 || Socorro || LINEAR || — || align=right | 2.3 km || 
|-id=002 bgcolor=#E9E9E9
| 218002 ||  || — || December 11, 2001 || Socorro || LINEAR || — || align=right | 2.5 km || 
|-id=003 bgcolor=#E9E9E9
| 218003 ||  || — || December 11, 2001 || Socorro || LINEAR || — || align=right | 2.7 km || 
|-id=004 bgcolor=#E9E9E9
| 218004 ||  || — || December 11, 2001 || Socorro || LINEAR || — || align=right | 1.3 km || 
|-id=005 bgcolor=#fefefe
| 218005 ||  || — || December 15, 2001 || Socorro || LINEAR || H || align=right data-sort-value="0.99" | 990 m || 
|-id=006 bgcolor=#E9E9E9
| 218006 ||  || — || December 11, 2001 || Socorro || LINEAR || — || align=right | 1.6 km || 
|-id=007 bgcolor=#E9E9E9
| 218007 ||  || — || December 14, 2001 || Socorro || LINEAR || — || align=right | 1.2 km || 
|-id=008 bgcolor=#E9E9E9
| 218008 ||  || — || December 14, 2001 || Socorro || LINEAR || — || align=right | 1.8 km || 
|-id=009 bgcolor=#E9E9E9
| 218009 ||  || — || December 11, 2001 || Socorro || LINEAR || — || align=right | 1.4 km || 
|-id=010 bgcolor=#E9E9E9
| 218010 ||  || — || December 14, 2001 || Socorro || LINEAR || — || align=right | 4.4 km || 
|-id=011 bgcolor=#E9E9E9
| 218011 ||  || — || December 15, 2001 || Socorro || LINEAR || — || align=right | 2.6 km || 
|-id=012 bgcolor=#E9E9E9
| 218012 ||  || — || December 15, 2001 || Socorro || LINEAR || — || align=right | 2.0 km || 
|-id=013 bgcolor=#E9E9E9
| 218013 ||  || — || December 15, 2001 || Socorro || LINEAR || — || align=right | 3.6 km || 
|-id=014 bgcolor=#E9E9E9
| 218014 ||  || — || December 15, 2001 || Socorro || LINEAR || — || align=right | 3.7 km || 
|-id=015 bgcolor=#E9E9E9
| 218015 ||  || — || December 15, 2001 || Socorro || LINEAR || EUN || align=right | 2.1 km || 
|-id=016 bgcolor=#E9E9E9
| 218016 ||  || — || December 15, 2001 || Socorro || LINEAR || — || align=right | 1.9 km || 
|-id=017 bgcolor=#FFC2E0
| 218017 ||  || — || December 9, 2001 || Mauna Kea || D. J. Tholen || APOcritical || align=right data-sort-value="0.45" | 450 m || 
|-id=018 bgcolor=#E9E9E9
| 218018 ||  || — || December 17, 2001 || Socorro || LINEAR || MAR || align=right | 2.1 km || 
|-id=019 bgcolor=#fefefe
| 218019 ||  || — || December 17, 2001 || Socorro || LINEAR || H || align=right data-sort-value="0.88" | 880 m || 
|-id=020 bgcolor=#E9E9E9
| 218020 ||  || — || December 18, 2001 || Socorro || LINEAR || HEN || align=right | 1.6 km || 
|-id=021 bgcolor=#E9E9E9
| 218021 ||  || — || December 18, 2001 || Socorro || LINEAR || PAD || align=right | 2.8 km || 
|-id=022 bgcolor=#E9E9E9
| 218022 ||  || — || December 18, 2001 || Socorro || LINEAR || — || align=right | 1.9 km || 
|-id=023 bgcolor=#E9E9E9
| 218023 ||  || — || December 18, 2001 || Socorro || LINEAR || MAR || align=right | 2.0 km || 
|-id=024 bgcolor=#E9E9E9
| 218024 ||  || — || December 18, 2001 || Socorro || LINEAR || — || align=right | 3.1 km || 
|-id=025 bgcolor=#E9E9E9
| 218025 ||  || — || December 18, 2001 || Socorro || LINEAR || MRX || align=right | 1.6 km || 
|-id=026 bgcolor=#E9E9E9
| 218026 ||  || — || December 18, 2001 || Socorro || LINEAR || JUN || align=right | 2.1 km || 
|-id=027 bgcolor=#E9E9E9
| 218027 ||  || — || December 17, 2001 || Socorro || LINEAR || JUN || align=right | 1.9 km || 
|-id=028 bgcolor=#E9E9E9
| 218028 ||  || — || December 18, 2001 || Socorro || LINEAR || — || align=right | 2.1 km || 
|-id=029 bgcolor=#E9E9E9
| 218029 ||  || — || December 22, 2001 || Socorro || LINEAR || — || align=right | 4.4 km || 
|-id=030 bgcolor=#E9E9E9
| 218030 ||  || — || December 17, 2001 || Socorro || LINEAR || — || align=right | 2.5 km || 
|-id=031 bgcolor=#E9E9E9
| 218031 ||  || — || January 5, 2002 || Socorro || LINEAR || BRU || align=right | 3.7 km || 
|-id=032 bgcolor=#E9E9E9
| 218032 ||  || — || January 11, 2002 || Desert Eagle || W. K. Y. Yeung || — || align=right | 3.5 km || 
|-id=033 bgcolor=#E9E9E9
| 218033 ||  || — || January 6, 2002 || Socorro || LINEAR || — || align=right | 2.8 km || 
|-id=034 bgcolor=#E9E9E9
| 218034 ||  || — || January 9, 2002 || Socorro || LINEAR || — || align=right | 2.8 km || 
|-id=035 bgcolor=#E9E9E9
| 218035 ||  || — || January 9, 2002 || Socorro || LINEAR || AGN || align=right | 2.0 km || 
|-id=036 bgcolor=#E9E9E9
| 218036 ||  || — || January 9, 2002 || Socorro || LINEAR || — || align=right | 4.1 km || 
|-id=037 bgcolor=#E9E9E9
| 218037 ||  || — || January 9, 2002 || Socorro || LINEAR || — || align=right | 2.6 km || 
|-id=038 bgcolor=#E9E9E9
| 218038 ||  || — || January 9, 2002 || Socorro || LINEAR || — || align=right | 3.2 km || 
|-id=039 bgcolor=#E9E9E9
| 218039 ||  || — || January 13, 2002 || Socorro || LINEAR || AGN || align=right | 1.8 km || 
|-id=040 bgcolor=#E9E9E9
| 218040 ||  || — || January 13, 2002 || Apache Point || SDSS || — || align=right | 1.5 km || 
|-id=041 bgcolor=#E9E9E9
| 218041 ||  || — || January 18, 2002 || Anderson Mesa || LONEOS || — || align=right | 3.7 km || 
|-id=042 bgcolor=#fefefe
| 218042 ||  || — || January 23, 2002 || Socorro || LINEAR || V || align=right data-sort-value="0.94" | 940 m || 
|-id=043 bgcolor=#E9E9E9
| 218043 ||  || — || January 21, 2002 || Anderson Mesa || LONEOS || EUN || align=right | 2.4 km || 
|-id=044 bgcolor=#fefefe
| 218044 ||  || — || February 11, 2002 || Socorro || LINEAR || — || align=right | 1.2 km || 
|-id=045 bgcolor=#E9E9E9
| 218045 ||  || — || February 7, 2002 || Socorro || LINEAR || — || align=right | 2.7 km || 
|-id=046 bgcolor=#E9E9E9
| 218046 ||  || — || February 7, 2002 || Socorro || LINEAR || — || align=right | 2.1 km || 
|-id=047 bgcolor=#E9E9E9
| 218047 ||  || — || February 7, 2002 || Socorro || LINEAR || — || align=right | 3.6 km || 
|-id=048 bgcolor=#d6d6d6
| 218048 ||  || — || February 10, 2002 || Socorro || LINEAR || CHA || align=right | 2.9 km || 
|-id=049 bgcolor=#d6d6d6
| 218049 ||  || — || February 10, 2002 || Socorro || LINEAR || K-2 || align=right | 1.9 km || 
|-id=050 bgcolor=#E9E9E9
| 218050 ||  || — || February 3, 2002 || Haleakala || NEAT || TIN || align=right | 2.2 km || 
|-id=051 bgcolor=#d6d6d6
| 218051 ||  || — || February 13, 2002 || Socorro || LINEAR || — || align=right | 7.4 km || 
|-id=052 bgcolor=#d6d6d6
| 218052 ||  || — || February 11, 2002 || Socorro || LINEAR || — || align=right | 3.3 km || 
|-id=053 bgcolor=#FA8072
| 218053 ||  || — || February 20, 2002 || Kitt Peak || Spacewatch || — || align=right data-sort-value="0.91" | 910 m || 
|-id=054 bgcolor=#d6d6d6
| 218054 ||  || — || February 16, 2002 || Palomar || NEAT || — || align=right | 4.1 km || 
|-id=055 bgcolor=#d6d6d6
| 218055 ||  || — || March 10, 2002 || Cima Ekar || ADAS || — || align=right | 3.8 km || 
|-id=056 bgcolor=#d6d6d6
| 218056 ||  || — || March 9, 2002 || Kitt Peak || Spacewatch || — || align=right | 3.3 km || 
|-id=057 bgcolor=#d6d6d6
| 218057 ||  || — || March 12, 2002 || Socorro || LINEAR || — || align=right | 5.3 km || 
|-id=058 bgcolor=#d6d6d6
| 218058 ||  || — || March 10, 2002 || Haleakala || NEAT || — || align=right | 4.5 km || 
|-id=059 bgcolor=#d6d6d6
| 218059 ||  || — || March 11, 2002 || Palomar || NEAT || — || align=right | 5.2 km || 
|-id=060 bgcolor=#d6d6d6
| 218060 ||  || — || March 13, 2002 || Socorro || LINEAR || — || align=right | 5.3 km || 
|-id=061 bgcolor=#d6d6d6
| 218061 ||  || — || March 13, 2002 || Socorro || LINEAR || KAR || align=right | 1.8 km || 
|-id=062 bgcolor=#d6d6d6
| 218062 ||  || — || March 13, 2002 || Socorro || LINEAR || — || align=right | 3.8 km || 
|-id=063 bgcolor=#d6d6d6
| 218063 ||  || — || March 6, 2002 || Socorro || LINEAR || EUP || align=right | 6.8 km || 
|-id=064 bgcolor=#d6d6d6
| 218064 ||  || — || March 9, 2002 || Kitt Peak || Spacewatch || — || align=right | 5.8 km || 
|-id=065 bgcolor=#fefefe
| 218065 ||  || — || March 9, 2002 || Anderson Mesa || LONEOS || — || align=right | 1.0 km || 
|-id=066 bgcolor=#d6d6d6
| 218066 ||  || — || March 13, 2002 || Palomar || NEAT || — || align=right | 4.3 km || 
|-id=067 bgcolor=#d6d6d6
| 218067 ||  || — || March 15, 2002 || Palomar || NEAT || KOR || align=right | 2.1 km || 
|-id=068 bgcolor=#d6d6d6
| 218068 ||  || — || March 18, 2002 || Ondřejov || L. Kotková || FIR || align=right | 4.1 km || 
|-id=069 bgcolor=#d6d6d6
| 218069 ||  || — || March 18, 2002 || Kitt Peak || M. W. Buie || KOR || align=right | 1.8 km || 
|-id=070 bgcolor=#C2FFFF
| 218070 ||  || — || March 31, 2002 || Palomar || NEAT || L4 || align=right | 16 km || 
|-id=071 bgcolor=#d6d6d6
| 218071 ||  || — || April 4, 2002 || Haleakala || NEAT || — || align=right | 4.8 km || 
|-id=072 bgcolor=#d6d6d6
| 218072 ||  || — || April 8, 2002 || Palomar || NEAT || EOS || align=right | 3.1 km || 
|-id=073 bgcolor=#d6d6d6
| 218073 ||  || — || April 8, 2002 || Palomar || NEAT || ALA || align=right | 4.5 km || 
|-id=074 bgcolor=#d6d6d6
| 218074 ||  || — || April 8, 2002 || Palomar || NEAT || — || align=right | 8.6 km || 
|-id=075 bgcolor=#d6d6d6
| 218075 ||  || — || April 8, 2002 || Bergisch Gladbach || W. Bickel || HYG || align=right | 5.0 km || 
|-id=076 bgcolor=#d6d6d6
| 218076 ||  || — || April 9, 2002 || Anderson Mesa || LONEOS || — || align=right | 5.3 km || 
|-id=077 bgcolor=#d6d6d6
| 218077 ||  || — || April 10, 2002 || Socorro || LINEAR || — || align=right | 5.3 km || 
|-id=078 bgcolor=#fefefe
| 218078 ||  || — || April 8, 2002 || Palomar || NEAT || FLO || align=right data-sort-value="0.74" | 740 m || 
|-id=079 bgcolor=#d6d6d6
| 218079 ||  || — || April 9, 2002 || Anderson Mesa || LONEOS || — || align=right | 5.3 km || 
|-id=080 bgcolor=#d6d6d6
| 218080 ||  || — || April 10, 2002 || Socorro || LINEAR || — || align=right | 4.6 km || 
|-id=081 bgcolor=#d6d6d6
| 218081 ||  || — || April 11, 2002 || Socorro || LINEAR || — || align=right | 5.1 km || 
|-id=082 bgcolor=#FA8072
| 218082 ||  || — || April 12, 2002 || Palomar || NEAT || — || align=right | 1.1 km || 
|-id=083 bgcolor=#d6d6d6
| 218083 ||  || — || April 12, 2002 || Socorro || LINEAR || URS || align=right | 5.9 km || 
|-id=084 bgcolor=#d6d6d6
| 218084 ||  || — || April 12, 2002 || Socorro || LINEAR || — || align=right | 4.0 km || 
|-id=085 bgcolor=#d6d6d6
| 218085 ||  || — || April 13, 2002 || Palomar || NEAT || — || align=right | 6.1 km || 
|-id=086 bgcolor=#d6d6d6
| 218086 ||  || — || April 14, 2002 || Socorro || LINEAR || HYG || align=right | 4.6 km || 
|-id=087 bgcolor=#d6d6d6
| 218087 ||  || — || April 8, 2002 || Palomar || NEAT || HYG || align=right | 4.3 km || 
|-id=088 bgcolor=#d6d6d6
| 218088 ||  || — || April 18, 2002 || Palomar || NEAT || — || align=right | 5.4 km || 
|-id=089 bgcolor=#d6d6d6
| 218089 ||  || — || April 21, 2002 || Socorro || LINEAR || EUP || align=right | 5.9 km || 
|-id=090 bgcolor=#d6d6d6
| 218090 ||  || — || May 4, 2002 || Palomar || NEAT || — || align=right | 5.6 km || 
|-id=091 bgcolor=#fefefe
| 218091 ||  || — || May 7, 2002 || Socorro || LINEAR || — || align=right | 1.1 km || 
|-id=092 bgcolor=#d6d6d6
| 218092 ||  || — || May 7, 2002 || Palomar || NEAT || — || align=right | 5.3 km || 
|-id=093 bgcolor=#fefefe
| 218093 ||  || — || May 9, 2002 || Palomar || NEAT || — || align=right | 1.1 km || 
|-id=094 bgcolor=#fefefe
| 218094 ||  || — || May 11, 2002 || Socorro || LINEAR || — || align=right data-sort-value="0.91" | 910 m || 
|-id=095 bgcolor=#d6d6d6
| 218095 ||  || — || May 6, 2002 || Palomar || NEAT || EOS || align=right | 3.1 km || 
|-id=096 bgcolor=#fefefe
| 218096 ||  || — || May 30, 2002 || Palomar || NEAT || — || align=right | 1.1 km || 
|-id=097 bgcolor=#d6d6d6
| 218097 Maoxianxin ||  ||  || June 1, 2002 || Palomar || NEAT || — || align=right | 4.8 km || 
|-id=098 bgcolor=#FA8072
| 218098 || 2002 MG || — || June 17, 2002 || Socorro || LINEAR || PHO || align=right | 1.9 km || 
|-id=099 bgcolor=#fefefe
| 218099 ||  || — || June 26, 2002 || Palomar || NEAT || — || align=right | 1.7 km || 
|-id=100 bgcolor=#fefefe
| 218100 ||  || — || July 6, 2002 || Needville || Needville Obs. || NYS || align=right data-sort-value="0.73" | 730 m || 
|}

218101–218200 

|-bgcolor=#fefefe
| 218101 ||  || — || July 9, 2002 || Socorro || LINEAR || — || align=right | 1.1 km || 
|-id=102 bgcolor=#fefefe
| 218102 ||  || — || July 9, 2002 || Socorro || LINEAR || — || align=right | 1.2 km || 
|-id=103 bgcolor=#fefefe
| 218103 ||  || — || July 14, 2002 || Socorro || LINEAR || — || align=right | 1.5 km || 
|-id=104 bgcolor=#fefefe
| 218104 ||  || — || July 9, 2002 || Socorro || LINEAR || — || align=right | 1.3 km || 
|-id=105 bgcolor=#fefefe
| 218105 ||  || — || July 4, 2002 || Palomar || NEAT || — || align=right data-sort-value="0.85" | 850 m || 
|-id=106 bgcolor=#fefefe
| 218106 ||  || — || July 18, 2002 || Socorro || LINEAR || — || align=right | 1.5 km || 
|-id=107 bgcolor=#fefefe
| 218107 ||  || — || July 18, 2002 || Socorro || LINEAR || FLO || align=right data-sort-value="0.89" | 890 m || 
|-id=108 bgcolor=#fefefe
| 218108 ||  || — || July 22, 2002 || Palomar || NEAT || — || align=right data-sort-value="0.90" | 900 m || 
|-id=109 bgcolor=#fefefe
| 218109 ||  || — || July 31, 2002 || Socorro || LINEAR || PHO || align=right | 1.9 km || 
|-id=110 bgcolor=#fefefe
| 218110 ||  || — || July 21, 2002 || Palomar || NEAT || V || align=right data-sort-value="0.89" | 890 m || 
|-id=111 bgcolor=#fefefe
| 218111 ||  || — || August 6, 2002 || Palomar || NEAT || — || align=right data-sort-value="0.85" | 850 m || 
|-id=112 bgcolor=#fefefe
| 218112 ||  || — || August 6, 2002 || Palomar || NEAT || NYS || align=right data-sort-value="0.93" | 930 m || 
|-id=113 bgcolor=#fefefe
| 218113 ||  || — || August 8, 2002 || Palomar || NEAT || FLO || align=right | 1.3 km || 
|-id=114 bgcolor=#fefefe
| 218114 ||  || — || August 10, 2002 || Socorro || LINEAR || — || align=right | 2.0 km || 
|-id=115 bgcolor=#fefefe
| 218115 ||  || — || August 10, 2002 || Socorro || LINEAR || NYS || align=right data-sort-value="0.89" | 890 m || 
|-id=116 bgcolor=#FA8072
| 218116 ||  || — || August 6, 2002 || Palomar || NEAT || — || align=right data-sort-value="0.84" | 840 m || 
|-id=117 bgcolor=#fefefe
| 218117 ||  || — || August 12, 2002 || Socorro || LINEAR || V || align=right data-sort-value="0.75" | 750 m || 
|-id=118 bgcolor=#fefefe
| 218118 ||  || — || August 11, 2002 || Palomar || NEAT || FLO || align=right data-sort-value="0.91" | 910 m || 
|-id=119 bgcolor=#fefefe
| 218119 ||  || — || August 12, 2002 || Socorro || LINEAR || V || align=right data-sort-value="0.78" | 780 m || 
|-id=120 bgcolor=#fefefe
| 218120 ||  || — || August 13, 2002 || Socorro || LINEAR || — || align=right | 1.1 km || 
|-id=121 bgcolor=#fefefe
| 218121 ||  || — || August 3, 2002 || Campo Imperatore || CINEOS || PHO || align=right | 3.3 km || 
|-id=122 bgcolor=#fefefe
| 218122 ||  || — || August 13, 2002 || Palomar || NEAT || PHO || align=right | 3.0 km || 
|-id=123 bgcolor=#fefefe
| 218123 ||  || — || August 13, 2002 || Anderson Mesa || LONEOS || — || align=right | 1.4 km || 
|-id=124 bgcolor=#fefefe
| 218124 ||  || — || August 13, 2002 || Anderson Mesa || LONEOS || FLO || align=right | 1.2 km || 
|-id=125 bgcolor=#fefefe
| 218125 ||  || — || August 14, 2002 || Socorro || LINEAR || FLO || align=right data-sort-value="0.99" | 990 m || 
|-id=126 bgcolor=#fefefe
| 218126 ||  || — || August 14, 2002 || Socorro || LINEAR || NYS || align=right data-sort-value="0.82" | 820 m || 
|-id=127 bgcolor=#fefefe
| 218127 ||  || — || August 12, 2002 || Socorro || LINEAR || PHO || align=right | 1.5 km || 
|-id=128 bgcolor=#fefefe
| 218128 ||  || — || August 11, 2002 || Socorro || LINEAR || — || align=right | 1.2 km || 
|-id=129 bgcolor=#fefefe
| 218129 ||  || — || August 28, 2002 || Palomar || NEAT || — || align=right | 1.1 km || 
|-id=130 bgcolor=#fefefe
| 218130 ||  || — || August 28, 2002 || Palomar || NEAT || — || align=right data-sort-value="0.83" | 830 m || 
|-id=131 bgcolor=#fefefe
| 218131 ||  || — || August 31, 2002 || Kitt Peak || Spacewatch || — || align=right | 1.1 km || 
|-id=132 bgcolor=#fefefe
| 218132 ||  || — || August 31, 2002 || Kitt Peak || Spacewatch || — || align=right | 1.3 km || 
|-id=133 bgcolor=#fefefe
| 218133 ||  || — || August 27, 2002 || Palomar || NEAT || NYS || align=right data-sort-value="0.58" | 580 m || 
|-id=134 bgcolor=#d6d6d6
| 218134 ||  || — || August 16, 2002 || Palomar || NEAT || — || align=right | 3.3 km || 
|-id=135 bgcolor=#fefefe
| 218135 ||  || — || August 16, 2002 || Palomar || NEAT || FLO || align=right data-sort-value="0.76" | 760 m || 
|-id=136 bgcolor=#fefefe
| 218136 ||  || — || August 18, 2002 || Palomar || NEAT || — || align=right data-sort-value="0.88" | 880 m || 
|-id=137 bgcolor=#fefefe
| 218137 ||  || — || September 4, 2002 || Anderson Mesa || LONEOS || NYS || align=right data-sort-value="0.74" | 740 m || 
|-id=138 bgcolor=#fefefe
| 218138 ||  || — || September 3, 2002 || Haleakala || NEAT || — || align=right | 1.2 km || 
|-id=139 bgcolor=#fefefe
| 218139 ||  || — || September 4, 2002 || Anderson Mesa || LONEOS || FLO || align=right data-sort-value="0.74" | 740 m || 
|-id=140 bgcolor=#d6d6d6
| 218140 ||  || — || September 4, 2002 || Anderson Mesa || LONEOS || — || align=right | 5.8 km || 
|-id=141 bgcolor=#fefefe
| 218141 ||  || — || September 5, 2002 || Socorro || LINEAR || — || align=right | 1.4 km || 
|-id=142 bgcolor=#E9E9E9
| 218142 ||  || — || September 5, 2002 || Socorro || LINEAR || — || align=right | 4.7 km || 
|-id=143 bgcolor=#fefefe
| 218143 ||  || — || September 5, 2002 || Anderson Mesa || LONEOS || — || align=right | 1.5 km || 
|-id=144 bgcolor=#FA8072
| 218144 ||  || — || September 6, 2002 || Socorro || LINEAR || moonslow || align=right | 2.8 km || 
|-id=145 bgcolor=#d6d6d6
| 218145 ||  || — || September 5, 2002 || Socorro || LINEAR || — || align=right | 3.9 km || 
|-id=146 bgcolor=#fefefe
| 218146 ||  || — || September 5, 2002 || Socorro || LINEAR || V || align=right | 1.1 km || 
|-id=147 bgcolor=#fefefe
| 218147 ||  || — || September 5, 2002 || Socorro || LINEAR || FLO || align=right | 1.2 km || 
|-id=148 bgcolor=#fefefe
| 218148 ||  || — || September 5, 2002 || Socorro || LINEAR || NYS || align=right data-sort-value="0.98" | 980 m || 
|-id=149 bgcolor=#fefefe
| 218149 ||  || — || September 5, 2002 || Socorro || LINEAR || — || align=right | 1.5 km || 
|-id=150 bgcolor=#fefefe
| 218150 ||  || — || September 5, 2002 || Socorro || LINEAR || — || align=right | 1.7 km || 
|-id=151 bgcolor=#fefefe
| 218151 ||  || — || September 6, 2002 || Socorro || LINEAR || — || align=right | 1.4 km || 
|-id=152 bgcolor=#fefefe
| 218152 ||  || — || September 7, 2002 || Socorro || LINEAR || — || align=right | 2.0 km || 
|-id=153 bgcolor=#fefefe
| 218153 ||  || — || September 9, 2002 || Campo Imperatore || CINEOS || — || align=right | 1.6 km || 
|-id=154 bgcolor=#fefefe
| 218154 ||  || — || September 9, 2002 || Haleakala || NEAT || — || align=right | 1.5 km || 
|-id=155 bgcolor=#fefefe
| 218155 ||  || — || September 10, 2002 || Haleakala || NEAT || — || align=right data-sort-value="0.98" | 980 m || 
|-id=156 bgcolor=#fefefe
| 218156 ||  || — || September 11, 2002 || Palomar || NEAT || NYS || align=right data-sort-value="0.82" | 820 m || 
|-id=157 bgcolor=#fefefe
| 218157 ||  || — || September 11, 2002 || Haleakala || NEAT || V || align=right data-sort-value="0.86" | 860 m || 
|-id=158 bgcolor=#fefefe
| 218158 ||  || — || September 12, 2002 || Palomar || NEAT || — || align=right | 1.2 km || 
|-id=159 bgcolor=#fefefe
| 218159 ||  || — || September 13, 2002 || Socorro || LINEAR || FLO || align=right | 1.1 km || 
|-id=160 bgcolor=#fefefe
| 218160 ||  || — || September 13, 2002 || Palomar || NEAT || FLO || align=right data-sort-value="0.83" | 830 m || 
|-id=161 bgcolor=#fefefe
| 218161 ||  || — || September 14, 2002 || Kitt Peak || Spacewatch || — || align=right data-sort-value="0.79" | 790 m || 
|-id=162 bgcolor=#fefefe
| 218162 ||  || — || September 13, 2002 || Anderson Mesa || LONEOS || — || align=right | 1.3 km || 
|-id=163 bgcolor=#fefefe
| 218163 ||  || — || September 13, 2002 || Palomar || NEAT || V || align=right data-sort-value="0.77" | 770 m || 
|-id=164 bgcolor=#fefefe
| 218164 ||  || — || September 14, 2002 || Haleakala || NEAT || V || align=right data-sort-value="0.76" | 760 m || 
|-id=165 bgcolor=#fefefe
| 218165 ||  || — || September 15, 2002 || Palomar || NEAT || — || align=right data-sort-value="0.97" | 970 m || 
|-id=166 bgcolor=#fefefe
| 218166 ||  || — || September 13, 2002 || Palomar || NEAT || — || align=right data-sort-value="0.97" | 970 m || 
|-id=167 bgcolor=#fefefe
| 218167 ||  || — || September 27, 2002 || Palomar || NEAT || — || align=right data-sort-value="0.92" | 920 m || 
|-id=168 bgcolor=#fefefe
| 218168 ||  || — || September 27, 2002 || Palomar || NEAT || — || align=right | 1.0 km || 
|-id=169 bgcolor=#d6d6d6
| 218169 ||  || — || September 27, 2002 || Palomar || NEAT || — || align=right | 3.2 km || 
|-id=170 bgcolor=#d6d6d6
| 218170 ||  || — || September 27, 2002 || Palomar || NEAT || — || align=right | 4.7 km || 
|-id=171 bgcolor=#fefefe
| 218171 ||  || — || September 30, 2002 || Socorro || LINEAR || — || align=right | 1.3 km || 
|-id=172 bgcolor=#fefefe
| 218172 ||  || — || September 28, 2002 || Haleakala || NEAT || NYS || align=right | 1.0 km || 
|-id=173 bgcolor=#fefefe
| 218173 ||  || — || September 29, 2002 || Haleakala || NEAT || V || align=right | 1.1 km || 
|-id=174 bgcolor=#fefefe
| 218174 ||  || — || September 16, 2002 || Palomar || NEAT || V || align=right data-sort-value="0.83" | 830 m || 
|-id=175 bgcolor=#fefefe
| 218175 ||  || — || September 28, 2002 || Haleakala || NEAT || FLO || align=right | 1.0 km || 
|-id=176 bgcolor=#fefefe
| 218176 ||  || — || October 1, 2002 || Anderson Mesa || LONEOS || NYS || align=right data-sort-value="0.88" | 880 m || 
|-id=177 bgcolor=#fefefe
| 218177 ||  || — || October 1, 2002 || Anderson Mesa || LONEOS || — || align=right | 1.8 km || 
|-id=178 bgcolor=#fefefe
| 218178 ||  || — || October 1, 2002 || Anderson Mesa || LONEOS || MAS || align=right data-sort-value="0.85" | 850 m || 
|-id=179 bgcolor=#fefefe
| 218179 ||  || — || October 2, 2002 || Socorro || LINEAR || V || align=right | 1.2 km || 
|-id=180 bgcolor=#fefefe
| 218180 ||  || — || October 2, 2002 || Socorro || LINEAR || NYS || align=right data-sort-value="0.99" | 990 m || 
|-id=181 bgcolor=#fefefe
| 218181 ||  || — || October 2, 2002 || Socorro || LINEAR || NYS || align=right | 1.0 km || 
|-id=182 bgcolor=#fefefe
| 218182 ||  || — || October 2, 2002 || Socorro || LINEAR || V || align=right data-sort-value="0.87" | 870 m || 
|-id=183 bgcolor=#fefefe
| 218183 ||  || — || October 2, 2002 || Socorro || LINEAR || — || align=right | 1.5 km || 
|-id=184 bgcolor=#fefefe
| 218184 ||  || — || October 2, 2002 || Socorro || LINEAR || — || align=right | 1.6 km || 
|-id=185 bgcolor=#fefefe
| 218185 ||  || — || October 2, 2002 || Socorro || LINEAR || — || align=right | 1.3 km || 
|-id=186 bgcolor=#fefefe
| 218186 ||  || — || October 2, 2002 || Socorro || LINEAR || ERI || align=right | 2.7 km || 
|-id=187 bgcolor=#fefefe
| 218187 ||  || — || October 3, 2002 || Campo Imperatore || CINEOS || — || align=right | 1.3 km || 
|-id=188 bgcolor=#fefefe
| 218188 ||  || — || October 7, 2002 || Socorro || LINEAR || PHO || align=right | 1.7 km || 
|-id=189 bgcolor=#fefefe
| 218189 ||  || — || October 7, 2002 || Socorro || LINEAR || PHO || align=right | 1.5 km || 
|-id=190 bgcolor=#fefefe
| 218190 ||  || — || October 1, 2002 || Socorro || LINEAR || — || align=right | 1.2 km || 
|-id=191 bgcolor=#fefefe
| 218191 ||  || — || October 2, 2002 || Haleakala || NEAT || V || align=right data-sort-value="0.95" | 950 m || 
|-id=192 bgcolor=#d6d6d6
| 218192 ||  || — || October 3, 2002 || Socorro || LINEAR || HYG || align=right | 3.6 km || 
|-id=193 bgcolor=#fefefe
| 218193 ||  || — || October 3, 2002 || Palomar || NEAT || — || align=right | 1.2 km || 
|-id=194 bgcolor=#fefefe
| 218194 ||  || — || October 3, 2002 || Palomar || NEAT || V || align=right | 1.1 km || 
|-id=195 bgcolor=#fefefe
| 218195 ||  || — || October 3, 2002 || Campo Imperatore || CINEOS || — || align=right | 1.2 km || 
|-id=196 bgcolor=#fefefe
| 218196 ||  || — || October 4, 2002 || Socorro || LINEAR || — || align=right | 1.0 km || 
|-id=197 bgcolor=#fefefe
| 218197 ||  || — || October 2, 2002 || Campo Imperatore || CINEOS || — || align=right | 1.4 km || 
|-id=198 bgcolor=#fefefe
| 218198 ||  || — || October 4, 2002 || Socorro || LINEAR || — || align=right data-sort-value="0.95" | 950 m || 
|-id=199 bgcolor=#fefefe
| 218199 ||  || — || October 4, 2002 || Palomar || NEAT || — || align=right | 1.6 km || 
|-id=200 bgcolor=#fefefe
| 218200 ||  || — || October 4, 2002 || Socorro || LINEAR || — || align=right | 1.2 km || 
|}

218201–218300 

|-bgcolor=#E9E9E9
| 218201 ||  || — || October 4, 2002 || Socorro || LINEAR || — || align=right | 2.9 km || 
|-id=202 bgcolor=#fefefe
| 218202 ||  || — || October 4, 2002 || Socorro || LINEAR || V || align=right data-sort-value="0.99" | 990 m || 
|-id=203 bgcolor=#fefefe
| 218203 ||  || — || October 4, 2002 || Socorro || LINEAR || — || align=right | 1.3 km || 
|-id=204 bgcolor=#d6d6d6
| 218204 ||  || — || October 3, 2002 || Socorro || LINEAR || EOS || align=right | 3.0 km || 
|-id=205 bgcolor=#fefefe
| 218205 ||  || — || October 5, 2002 || Socorro || LINEAR || — || align=right data-sort-value="0.98" | 980 m || 
|-id=206 bgcolor=#fefefe
| 218206 ||  || — || October 8, 2002 || Anderson Mesa || LONEOS || NYS || align=right data-sort-value="0.81" | 810 m || 
|-id=207 bgcolor=#fefefe
| 218207 ||  || — || October 5, 2002 || Socorro || LINEAR || — || align=right | 1.2 km || 
|-id=208 bgcolor=#fefefe
| 218208 ||  || — || October 8, 2002 || Anderson Mesa || LONEOS || MAS || align=right data-sort-value="0.98" | 980 m || 
|-id=209 bgcolor=#fefefe
| 218209 ||  || — || October 9, 2002 || Socorro || LINEAR || NYS || align=right data-sort-value="0.96" | 960 m || 
|-id=210 bgcolor=#E9E9E9
| 218210 ||  || — || October 10, 2002 || Socorro || LINEAR || — || align=right | 2.7 km || 
|-id=211 bgcolor=#fefefe
| 218211 ||  || — || October 10, 2002 || Socorro || LINEAR || — || align=right | 1.3 km || 
|-id=212 bgcolor=#fefefe
| 218212 ||  || — || October 10, 2002 || Socorro || LINEAR || — || align=right | 1.7 km || 
|-id=213 bgcolor=#fefefe
| 218213 ||  || — || October 10, 2002 || Socorro || LINEAR || — || align=right | 1.1 km || 
|-id=214 bgcolor=#fefefe
| 218214 ||  || — || October 12, 2002 || Socorro || LINEAR || — || align=right | 1.6 km || 
|-id=215 bgcolor=#fefefe
| 218215 ||  || — || October 5, 2002 || Apache Point || SDSS || V || align=right data-sort-value="0.92" | 920 m || 
|-id=216 bgcolor=#fefefe
| 218216 ||  || — || October 30, 2002 || Haleakala || NEAT || — || align=right | 1.1 km || 
|-id=217 bgcolor=#fefefe
| 218217 ||  || — || October 31, 2002 || Palomar || NEAT || MAS || align=right data-sort-value="0.83" | 830 m || 
|-id=218 bgcolor=#fefefe
| 218218 ||  || — || November 4, 2002 || Palomar || NEAT || — || align=right | 1.2 km || 
|-id=219 bgcolor=#fefefe
| 218219 ||  || — || November 1, 2002 || Palomar || NEAT || NYS || align=right | 1.1 km || 
|-id=220 bgcolor=#fefefe
| 218220 ||  || — || November 5, 2002 || Socorro || LINEAR || — || align=right | 1.2 km || 
|-id=221 bgcolor=#fefefe
| 218221 ||  || — || November 5, 2002 || Socorro || LINEAR || — || align=right | 1.3 km || 
|-id=222 bgcolor=#fefefe
| 218222 ||  || — || November 5, 2002 || Socorro || LINEAR || — || align=right | 1.4 km || 
|-id=223 bgcolor=#fefefe
| 218223 ||  || — || November 5, 2002 || Socorro || LINEAR || NYS || align=right | 1.0 km || 
|-id=224 bgcolor=#fefefe
| 218224 ||  || — || November 7, 2002 || Socorro || LINEAR || V || align=right | 1.2 km || 
|-id=225 bgcolor=#fefefe
| 218225 ||  || — || November 7, 2002 || Anderson Mesa || LONEOS || — || align=right | 2.7 km || 
|-id=226 bgcolor=#fefefe
| 218226 ||  || — || November 7, 2002 || Socorro || LINEAR || NYS || align=right | 1.0 km || 
|-id=227 bgcolor=#fefefe
| 218227 ||  || — || November 7, 2002 || Socorro || LINEAR || NYS || align=right | 1.2 km || 
|-id=228 bgcolor=#fefefe
| 218228 ||  || — || November 7, 2002 || Socorro || LINEAR || — || align=right | 1.2 km || 
|-id=229 bgcolor=#fefefe
| 218229 ||  || — || November 7, 2002 || Socorro || LINEAR || — || align=right | 1.6 km || 
|-id=230 bgcolor=#fefefe
| 218230 ||  || — || November 7, 2002 || Socorro || LINEAR || — || align=right | 1.9 km || 
|-id=231 bgcolor=#fefefe
| 218231 ||  || — || November 11, 2002 || Socorro || LINEAR || — || align=right | 2.1 km || 
|-id=232 bgcolor=#fefefe
| 218232 ||  || — || November 11, 2002 || Socorro || LINEAR || — || align=right | 1.4 km || 
|-id=233 bgcolor=#fefefe
| 218233 ||  || — || November 13, 2002 || Palomar || NEAT || CLA || align=right | 2.3 km || 
|-id=234 bgcolor=#fefefe
| 218234 ||  || — || November 13, 2002 || Palomar || NEAT || MAS || align=right | 1.1 km || 
|-id=235 bgcolor=#fefefe
| 218235 ||  || — || November 14, 2002 || Socorro || LINEAR || — || align=right | 1.3 km || 
|-id=236 bgcolor=#fefefe
| 218236 ||  || — || November 21, 2002 || Palomar || NEAT || V || align=right data-sort-value="0.95" | 950 m || 
|-id=237 bgcolor=#fefefe
| 218237 ||  || — || November 22, 2002 || Palomar || NEAT || — || align=right | 1.1 km || 
|-id=238 bgcolor=#fefefe
| 218238 ||  || — || November 22, 2002 || Palomar || NEAT || MAS || align=right data-sort-value="0.83" | 830 m || 
|-id=239 bgcolor=#fefefe
| 218239 ||  || — || December 1, 2002 || Haleakala || NEAT || MAS || align=right data-sort-value="0.96" | 960 m || 
|-id=240 bgcolor=#fefefe
| 218240 ||  || — || December 5, 2002 || Socorro || LINEAR || V || align=right | 1.1 km || 
|-id=241 bgcolor=#d6d6d6
| 218241 ||  || — || December 9, 2002 || Kitt Peak || Spacewatch || SHU3:2 || align=right | 8.6 km || 
|-id=242 bgcolor=#fefefe
| 218242 ||  || — || December 11, 2002 || Socorro || LINEAR || — || align=right | 2.4 km || 
|-id=243 bgcolor=#fefefe
| 218243 ||  || — || December 11, 2002 || Socorro || LINEAR || MAS || align=right | 1.4 km || 
|-id=244 bgcolor=#fefefe
| 218244 ||  || — || December 11, 2002 || Socorro || LINEAR || — || align=right | 1.3 km || 
|-id=245 bgcolor=#fefefe
| 218245 ||  || — || December 11, 2002 || Socorro || LINEAR || NYS || align=right | 1.2 km || 
|-id=246 bgcolor=#E9E9E9
| 218246 ||  || — || December 11, 2002 || Socorro || LINEAR || — || align=right | 1.5 km || 
|-id=247 bgcolor=#fefefe
| 218247 ||  || — || December 5, 2002 || Socorro || LINEAR || MAS || align=right | 1.0 km || 
|-id=248 bgcolor=#d6d6d6
| 218248 ||  || — || December 6, 2002 || Socorro || LINEAR || — || align=right | 3.6 km || 
|-id=249 bgcolor=#E9E9E9
| 218249 ||  || — || December 6, 2002 || Socorro || LINEAR || — || align=right | 1.8 km || 
|-id=250 bgcolor=#fefefe
| 218250 ||  || — || December 10, 2002 || Palomar || NEAT || — || align=right | 1.3 km || 
|-id=251 bgcolor=#FA8072
| 218251 ||  || — || January 2, 2003 || Socorro || LINEAR || — || align=right | 1.7 km || 
|-id=252 bgcolor=#fefefe
| 218252 ||  || — || January 1, 2003 || Socorro || LINEAR || — || align=right | 3.0 km || 
|-id=253 bgcolor=#E9E9E9
| 218253 ||  || — || January 4, 2003 || Socorro || LINEAR || — || align=right | 1.7 km || 
|-id=254 bgcolor=#fefefe
| 218254 ||  || — || January 4, 2003 || Socorro || LINEAR || — || align=right | 1.3 km || 
|-id=255 bgcolor=#E9E9E9
| 218255 ||  || — || January 7, 2003 || Socorro || LINEAR || CLO || align=right | 3.6 km || 
|-id=256 bgcolor=#fefefe
| 218256 ||  || — || January 7, 2003 || Socorro || LINEAR || PHO || align=right | 1.7 km || 
|-id=257 bgcolor=#E9E9E9
| 218257 ||  || — || January 7, 2003 || Socorro || LINEAR || EUN || align=right | 2.1 km || 
|-id=258 bgcolor=#fefefe
| 218258 ||  || — || January 5, 2003 || Socorro || LINEAR || — || align=right | 1.8 km || 
|-id=259 bgcolor=#fefefe
| 218259 ||  || — || January 7, 2003 || Socorro || LINEAR || — || align=right | 1.6 km || 
|-id=260 bgcolor=#fefefe
| 218260 ||  || — || January 11, 2003 || Socorro || LINEAR || H || align=right | 1.1 km || 
|-id=261 bgcolor=#E9E9E9
| 218261 ||  || — || January 23, 2003 || Kvistaberg || UDAS || — || align=right | 4.1 km || 
|-id=262 bgcolor=#E9E9E9
| 218262 ||  || — || January 26, 2003 || Anderson Mesa || LONEOS || — || align=right | 1.4 km || 
|-id=263 bgcolor=#E9E9E9
| 218263 ||  || — || January 27, 2003 || Socorro || LINEAR || BRU || align=right | 3.4 km || 
|-id=264 bgcolor=#fefefe
| 218264 ||  || — || January 28, 2003 || Socorro || LINEAR || KLI || align=right | 3.3 km || 
|-id=265 bgcolor=#E9E9E9
| 218265 ||  || — || January 29, 2003 || Palomar || NEAT || — || align=right | 2.6 km || 
|-id=266 bgcolor=#fefefe
| 218266 ||  || — || February 1, 2003 || Socorro || LINEAR || — || align=right | 1.1 km || 
|-id=267 bgcolor=#E9E9E9
| 218267 ||  || — || February 7, 2003 || Palomar || NEAT || — || align=right | 3.5 km || 
|-id=268 bgcolor=#E9E9E9
| 218268 Pierremariepelé ||  ||  || February 20, 2003 || Vicques || M. Ory || — || align=right | 1.5 km || 
|-id=269 bgcolor=#E9E9E9
| 218269 || 2003 DT || — || February 21, 2003 || Palomar || NEAT || — || align=right | 2.7 km || 
|-id=270 bgcolor=#fefefe
| 218270 || 2003 EK || — || March 3, 2003 || Haleakala || NEAT || H || align=right | 1.2 km || 
|-id=271 bgcolor=#FA8072
| 218271 ||  || — || March 6, 2003 || Socorro || LINEAR || — || align=right | 2.0 km || 
|-id=272 bgcolor=#E9E9E9
| 218272 ||  || — || March 6, 2003 || Socorro || LINEAR || — || align=right | 3.7 km || 
|-id=273 bgcolor=#d6d6d6
| 218273 ||  || — || March 9, 2003 || Socorro || LINEAR || 628 || align=right | 3.7 km || 
|-id=274 bgcolor=#E9E9E9
| 218274 ||  || — || March 29, 2003 || Piszkéstető || K. Sárneczky || — || align=right | 3.0 km || 
|-id=275 bgcolor=#E9E9E9
| 218275 ||  || — || March 23, 2003 || Kitt Peak || Spacewatch || — || align=right | 1.9 km || 
|-id=276 bgcolor=#E9E9E9
| 218276 ||  || — || March 23, 2003 || Kitt Peak || Spacewatch || — || align=right | 2.9 km || 
|-id=277 bgcolor=#E9E9E9
| 218277 ||  || — || March 24, 2003 || Kitt Peak || Spacewatch || — || align=right | 2.7 km || 
|-id=278 bgcolor=#d6d6d6
| 218278 ||  || — || March 26, 2003 || Palomar || NEAT || BRA || align=right | 2.3 km || 
|-id=279 bgcolor=#E9E9E9
| 218279 ||  || — || March 26, 2003 || Palomar || NEAT || — || align=right | 3.8 km || 
|-id=280 bgcolor=#E9E9E9
| 218280 ||  || — || March 26, 2003 || Kitt Peak || Spacewatch || GEF || align=right | 2.0 km || 
|-id=281 bgcolor=#E9E9E9
| 218281 ||  || — || March 26, 2003 || Palomar || NEAT || — || align=right | 1.2 km || 
|-id=282 bgcolor=#E9E9E9
| 218282 ||  || — || March 26, 2003 || Palomar || NEAT || — || align=right | 3.2 km || 
|-id=283 bgcolor=#E9E9E9
| 218283 ||  || — || March 29, 2003 || Anderson Mesa || LONEOS || — || align=right | 3.6 km || 
|-id=284 bgcolor=#E9E9E9
| 218284 ||  || — || April 7, 2003 || Palomar || NEAT || WIT || align=right | 1.8 km || 
|-id=285 bgcolor=#d6d6d6
| 218285 ||  || — || April 27, 2003 || Socorro || LINEAR || EUP || align=right | 7.3 km || 
|-id=286 bgcolor=#d6d6d6
| 218286 ||  || — || May 2, 2003 || Socorro || LINEAR || — || align=right | 5.9 km || 
|-id=287 bgcolor=#d6d6d6
| 218287 ||  || — || June 23, 2003 || Socorro || LINEAR || — || align=right | 4.6 km || 
|-id=288 bgcolor=#d6d6d6
| 218288 ||  || — || June 26, 2003 || Socorro || LINEAR || Tj (2.99) || align=right | 7.6 km || 
|-id=289 bgcolor=#d6d6d6
| 218289 ||  || — || July 22, 2003 || Haleakala || NEAT || — || align=right | 5.9 km || 
|-id=290 bgcolor=#d6d6d6
| 218290 ||  || — || July 22, 2003 || Campo Imperatore || CINEOS || — || align=right | 5.5 km || 
|-id=291 bgcolor=#d6d6d6
| 218291 ||  || — || July 22, 2003 || Palomar || NEAT || ELF || align=right | 5.6 km || 
|-id=292 bgcolor=#d6d6d6
| 218292 ||  || — || July 24, 2003 || Palomar || NEAT || — || align=right | 5.9 km || 
|-id=293 bgcolor=#d6d6d6
| 218293 ||  || — || August 8, 2003 || Kvistaberg || UDAS || — || align=right | 5.9 km || 
|-id=294 bgcolor=#d6d6d6
| 218294 ||  || — || August 22, 2003 || Socorro || LINEAR || — || align=right | 5.8 km || 
|-id=295 bgcolor=#d6d6d6
| 218295 ||  || — || August 22, 2003 || Palomar || NEAT || EUP || align=right | 7.1 km || 
|-id=296 bgcolor=#d6d6d6
| 218296 ||  || — || August 23, 2003 || Socorro || LINEAR || — || align=right | 9.3 km || 
|-id=297 bgcolor=#d6d6d6
| 218297 ||  || — || August 23, 2003 || Socorro || LINEAR || EUP || align=right | 6.1 km || 
|-id=298 bgcolor=#d6d6d6
| 218298 ||  || — || August 25, 2003 || Palomar || NEAT || — || align=right | 6.4 km || 
|-id=299 bgcolor=#d6d6d6
| 218299 ||  || — || September 13, 2003 || Haleakala || NEAT || URS || align=right | 5.9 km || 
|-id=300 bgcolor=#d6d6d6
| 218300 ||  || — || September 18, 2003 || Socorro || LINEAR || TIR || align=right | 3.5 km || 
|}

218301–218400 

|-bgcolor=#d6d6d6
| 218301 ||  || — || September 21, 2003 || Anderson Mesa || LONEOS || SYL7:4 || align=right | 7.9 km || 
|-id=302 bgcolor=#fefefe
| 218302 ||  || — || September 27, 2003 || Socorro || LINEAR || — || align=right data-sort-value="0.81" | 810 m || 
|-id=303 bgcolor=#E9E9E9
| 218303 ||  || — || September 28, 2003 || Kitt Peak || Spacewatch || — || align=right | 1.2 km || 
|-id=304 bgcolor=#d6d6d6
| 218304 ||  || — || September 28, 2003 || Socorro || LINEAR || — || align=right | 6.9 km || 
|-id=305 bgcolor=#d6d6d6
| 218305 ||  || — || September 30, 2003 || Socorro || LINEAR || — || align=right | 4.4 km || 
|-id=306 bgcolor=#E9E9E9
| 218306 ||  || — || September 27, 2003 || Apache Point || SDSS || HNS || align=right | 2.0 km || 
|-id=307 bgcolor=#fefefe
| 218307 ||  || — || October 20, 2003 || Kitt Peak || Spacewatch || — || align=right data-sort-value="0.91" | 910 m || 
|-id=308 bgcolor=#d6d6d6
| 218308 ||  || — || October 16, 2003 || Anderson Mesa || LONEOS || — || align=right | 5.4 km || 
|-id=309 bgcolor=#fefefe
| 218309 ||  || — || October 18, 2003 || Palomar || NEAT || — || align=right | 1.1 km || 
|-id=310 bgcolor=#fefefe
| 218310 ||  || — || October 26, 2003 || Kitt Peak || Spacewatch || — || align=right | 1.1 km || 
|-id=311 bgcolor=#fefefe
| 218311 ||  || — || October 30, 2003 || Socorro || LINEAR || — || align=right | 2.3 km || 
|-id=312 bgcolor=#fefefe
| 218312 ||  || — || November 16, 2003 || Kitt Peak || Spacewatch || FLO || align=right data-sort-value="0.75" | 750 m || 
|-id=313 bgcolor=#E9E9E9
| 218313 ||  || — || November 21, 2003 || Palomar || NEAT || — || align=right | 1.4 km || 
|-id=314 bgcolor=#fefefe
| 218314 ||  || — || December 13, 2003 || Socorro || LINEAR || PHO || align=right | 1.5 km || 
|-id=315 bgcolor=#fefefe
| 218315 ||  || — || December 17, 2003 || Anderson Mesa || LONEOS || — || align=right | 1.2 km || 
|-id=316 bgcolor=#fefefe
| 218316 ||  || — || December 17, 2003 || Kitt Peak || Spacewatch || — || align=right data-sort-value="0.90" | 900 m || 
|-id=317 bgcolor=#fefefe
| 218317 ||  || — || December 17, 2003 || Kitt Peak || Spacewatch || — || align=right | 1.1 km || 
|-id=318 bgcolor=#fefefe
| 218318 ||  || — || December 18, 2003 || Socorro || LINEAR || FLO || align=right data-sort-value="0.92" | 920 m || 
|-id=319 bgcolor=#fefefe
| 218319 ||  || — || December 18, 2003 || Socorro || LINEAR || — || align=right data-sort-value="0.80" | 800 m || 
|-id=320 bgcolor=#fefefe
| 218320 ||  || — || December 17, 2003 || Kitt Peak || Spacewatch || — || align=right | 1.3 km || 
|-id=321 bgcolor=#fefefe
| 218321 ||  || — || December 19, 2003 || Socorro || LINEAR || — || align=right | 1.1 km || 
|-id=322 bgcolor=#fefefe
| 218322 ||  || — || December 19, 2003 || Socorro || LINEAR || FLO || align=right data-sort-value="0.99" | 990 m || 
|-id=323 bgcolor=#FA8072
| 218323 ||  || — || December 27, 2003 || Socorro || LINEAR || — || align=right | 1.2 km || 
|-id=324 bgcolor=#fefefe
| 218324 ||  || — || December 28, 2003 || Socorro || LINEAR || FLO || align=right | 1.1 km || 
|-id=325 bgcolor=#fefefe
| 218325 ||  || — || December 28, 2003 || Socorro || LINEAR || — || align=right | 1.3 km || 
|-id=326 bgcolor=#fefefe
| 218326 ||  || — || December 28, 2003 || Kitt Peak || Spacewatch || FLO || align=right | 1.1 km || 
|-id=327 bgcolor=#fefefe
| 218327 ||  || — || January 16, 2004 || Palomar || NEAT || — || align=right | 1.2 km || 
|-id=328 bgcolor=#E9E9E9
| 218328 ||  || — || January 16, 2004 || Kitt Peak || Spacewatch || — || align=right | 1.4 km || 
|-id=329 bgcolor=#fefefe
| 218329 ||  || — || January 16, 2004 || Nogales || Tenagra II Obs. || V || align=right | 1.3 km || 
|-id=330 bgcolor=#fefefe
| 218330 ||  || — || January 19, 2004 || Kitt Peak || Spacewatch || — || align=right | 1.3 km || 
|-id=331 bgcolor=#fefefe
| 218331 ||  || — || January 21, 2004 || Socorro || LINEAR || V || align=right | 1.1 km || 
|-id=332 bgcolor=#fefefe
| 218332 ||  || — || January 21, 2004 || Socorro || LINEAR || — || align=right | 1.3 km || 
|-id=333 bgcolor=#fefefe
| 218333 ||  || — || January 22, 2004 || Socorro || LINEAR || FLO || align=right | 1.00 km || 
|-id=334 bgcolor=#E9E9E9
| 218334 ||  || — || January 24, 2004 || Socorro || LINEAR || GEF || align=right | 2.1 km || 
|-id=335 bgcolor=#fefefe
| 218335 ||  || — || January 22, 2004 || Socorro || LINEAR || NYS || align=right | 1.1 km || 
|-id=336 bgcolor=#E9E9E9
| 218336 ||  || — || January 27, 2004 || Anderson Mesa || LONEOS || — || align=right | 4.0 km || 
|-id=337 bgcolor=#fefefe
| 218337 ||  || — || January 23, 2004 || Socorro || LINEAR || FLO || align=right | 1.2 km || 
|-id=338 bgcolor=#fefefe
| 218338 ||  || — || January 27, 2004 || Kitt Peak || Spacewatch || — || align=right | 1.1 km || 
|-id=339 bgcolor=#fefefe
| 218339 ||  || — || January 30, 2004 || Modra || Modra Obs. || V || align=right data-sort-value="0.80" | 800 m || 
|-id=340 bgcolor=#FA8072
| 218340 ||  || — || January 16, 2004 || Kitt Peak || Spacewatch || — || align=right | 1.3 km || 
|-id=341 bgcolor=#fefefe
| 218341 ||  || — || February 10, 2004 || Palomar || NEAT || V || align=right data-sort-value="0.91" | 910 m || 
|-id=342 bgcolor=#fefefe
| 218342 ||  || — || February 11, 2004 || Palomar || NEAT || PHO || align=right | 1.0 km || 
|-id=343 bgcolor=#fefefe
| 218343 ||  || — || February 17, 2004 || Kitt Peak || Spacewatch || — || align=right | 1.3 km || 
|-id=344 bgcolor=#E9E9E9
| 218344 ||  || — || February 16, 2004 || Socorro || LINEAR || — || align=right | 2.8 km || 
|-id=345 bgcolor=#fefefe
| 218345 ||  || — || March 15, 2004 || Catalina || CSS || — || align=right | 1.2 km || 
|-id=346 bgcolor=#fefefe
| 218346 ||  || — || March 18, 2004 || Needville || Needville Obs. || — || align=right | 1.3 km || 
|-id=347 bgcolor=#E9E9E9
| 218347 ||  || — || March 16, 2004 || Palomar || NEAT || JUN || align=right | 1.6 km || 
|-id=348 bgcolor=#E9E9E9
| 218348 ||  || — || March 27, 2004 || Junk Bond || D. Healy || — || align=right | 2.3 km || 
|-id=349 bgcolor=#fefefe
| 218349 ||  || — || March 18, 2004 || Kitt Peak || Spacewatch || — || align=right | 1.7 km || 
|-id=350 bgcolor=#fefefe
| 218350 ||  || — || March 23, 2004 || Socorro || LINEAR || V || align=right | 1.2 km || 
|-id=351 bgcolor=#E9E9E9
| 218351 ||  || — || March 20, 2004 || Socorro || LINEAR || — || align=right | 1.9 km || 
|-id=352 bgcolor=#E9E9E9
| 218352 ||  || — || March 24, 2004 || Anderson Mesa || LONEOS || JUN || align=right | 1.4 km || 
|-id=353 bgcolor=#E9E9E9
| 218353 ||  || — || March 25, 2004 || Anderson Mesa || LONEOS || — || align=right | 2.1 km || 
|-id=354 bgcolor=#E9E9E9
| 218354 ||  || — || March 26, 2004 || Socorro || LINEAR || — || align=right | 2.9 km || 
|-id=355 bgcolor=#fefefe
| 218355 ||  || — || March 26, 2004 || Anderson Mesa || LONEOS || — || align=right | 1.3 km || 
|-id=356 bgcolor=#E9E9E9
| 218356 ||  || — || March 27, 2004 || Socorro || LINEAR || — || align=right | 3.7 km || 
|-id=357 bgcolor=#E9E9E9
| 218357 || 2004 GH || — || April 8, 2004 || Siding Spring || SSS || — || align=right | 2.1 km || 
|-id=358 bgcolor=#E9E9E9
| 218358 ||  || — || April 12, 2004 || Palomar || NEAT || — || align=right | 2.0 km || 
|-id=359 bgcolor=#E9E9E9
| 218359 ||  || — || April 12, 2004 || Reedy Creek || J. Broughton || — || align=right | 2.3 km || 
|-id=360 bgcolor=#E9E9E9
| 218360 ||  || — || April 12, 2004 || Kitt Peak || Spacewatch || RAF || align=right | 1.3 km || 
|-id=361 bgcolor=#d6d6d6
| 218361 ||  || — || April 14, 2004 || Palomar || NEAT || — || align=right | 6.8 km || 
|-id=362 bgcolor=#E9E9E9
| 218362 ||  || — || April 15, 2004 || Palomar || NEAT || GER || align=right | 2.6 km || 
|-id=363 bgcolor=#E9E9E9
| 218363 ||  || — || April 15, 2004 || Palomar || NEAT || EUN || align=right | 2.1 km || 
|-id=364 bgcolor=#E9E9E9
| 218364 ||  || — || April 23, 2004 || Haleakala || NEAT || MAR || align=right | 1.7 km || 
|-id=365 bgcolor=#E9E9E9
| 218365 ||  || — || April 23, 2004 || Socorro || LINEAR || — || align=right | 3.4 km || 
|-id=366 bgcolor=#fefefe
| 218366 ||  || — || April 30, 2004 || Kitt Peak || Spacewatch || — || align=right | 1.5 km || 
|-id=367 bgcolor=#E9E9E9
| 218367 ||  || — || May 9, 2004 || Haleakala || NEAT || — || align=right | 2.3 km || 
|-id=368 bgcolor=#E9E9E9
| 218368 ||  || — || May 10, 2004 || Reedy Creek || J. Broughton || ADE || align=right | 3.0 km || 
|-id=369 bgcolor=#E9E9E9
| 218369 ||  || — || May 10, 2004 || Palomar || NEAT || — || align=right | 3.9 km || 
|-id=370 bgcolor=#E9E9E9
| 218370 ||  || — || May 12, 2004 || Catalina || CSS || — || align=right | 2.3 km || 
|-id=371 bgcolor=#E9E9E9
| 218371 ||  || — || May 9, 2004 || Kitt Peak || Spacewatch || — || align=right | 1.9 km || 
|-id=372 bgcolor=#E9E9E9
| 218372 ||  || — || May 15, 2004 || Socorro || LINEAR || ADE || align=right | 3.9 km || 
|-id=373 bgcolor=#E9E9E9
| 218373 ||  || — || May 15, 2004 || Socorro || LINEAR || — || align=right | 2.6 km || 
|-id=374 bgcolor=#E9E9E9
| 218374 ||  || — || May 11, 2004 || Catalina || CSS || — || align=right | 2.6 km || 
|-id=375 bgcolor=#E9E9E9
| 218375 ||  || — || May 15, 2004 || Socorro || LINEAR || — || align=right | 3.4 km || 
|-id=376 bgcolor=#E9E9E9
| 218376 ||  || — || May 15, 2004 || Bergisch Gladbach || W. Bickel || — || align=right | 2.4 km || 
|-id=377 bgcolor=#E9E9E9
| 218377 ||  || — || May 22, 2004 || Goodricke-Pigott || Goodricke-Pigott Obs. || JUN || align=right | 1.8 km || 
|-id=378 bgcolor=#E9E9E9
| 218378 ||  || — || June 11, 2004 || Kitt Peak || Spacewatch || — || align=right | 2.5 km || 
|-id=379 bgcolor=#E9E9E9
| 218379 ||  || — || June 12, 2004 || Kitt Peak || Spacewatch || — || align=right | 3.0 km || 
|-id=380 bgcolor=#E9E9E9
| 218380 ||  || — || July 11, 2004 || Socorro || LINEAR || — || align=right | 1.8 km || 
|-id=381 bgcolor=#d6d6d6
| 218381 ||  || — || July 11, 2004 || Socorro || LINEAR || 628 || align=right | 2.8 km || 
|-id=382 bgcolor=#d6d6d6
| 218382 ||  || — || July 11, 2004 || Socorro || LINEAR || — || align=right | 3.3 km || 
|-id=383 bgcolor=#d6d6d6
| 218383 ||  || — || July 14, 2004 || Socorro || LINEAR || — || align=right | 6.0 km || 
|-id=384 bgcolor=#d6d6d6
| 218384 ||  || — || July 16, 2004 || Socorro || LINEAR || — || align=right | 5.0 km || 
|-id=385 bgcolor=#d6d6d6
| 218385 ||  || — || July 16, 2004 || Socorro || LINEAR || — || align=right | 6.5 km || 
|-id=386 bgcolor=#d6d6d6
| 218386 || 2004 PC || — || August 4, 2004 || Needville || Needville Obs. || 627 || align=right | 3.7 km || 
|-id=387 bgcolor=#d6d6d6
| 218387 ||  || — || August 7, 2004 || Palomar || NEAT || — || align=right | 3.4 km || 
|-id=388 bgcolor=#d6d6d6
| 218388 ||  || — || August 7, 2004 || Palomar || NEAT || EOS || align=right | 3.0 km || 
|-id=389 bgcolor=#d6d6d6
| 218389 ||  || — || August 7, 2004 || Palomar || NEAT || — || align=right | 6.2 km || 
|-id=390 bgcolor=#d6d6d6
| 218390 ||  || — || August 9, 2004 || Socorro || LINEAR || — || align=right | 4.9 km || 
|-id=391 bgcolor=#d6d6d6
| 218391 ||  || — || August 7, 2004 || Siding Spring || SSS || — || align=right | 5.3 km || 
|-id=392 bgcolor=#d6d6d6
| 218392 ||  || — || August 8, 2004 || Socorro || LINEAR || EOS || align=right | 4.0 km || 
|-id=393 bgcolor=#d6d6d6
| 218393 ||  || — || August 9, 2004 || Socorro || LINEAR || EOS || align=right | 2.7 km || 
|-id=394 bgcolor=#d6d6d6
| 218394 ||  || — || August 10, 2004 || Socorro || LINEAR || — || align=right | 5.1 km || 
|-id=395 bgcolor=#d6d6d6
| 218395 ||  || — || August 10, 2004 || Socorro || LINEAR || — || align=right | 3.5 km || 
|-id=396 bgcolor=#d6d6d6
| 218396 ||  || — || August 12, 2004 || Socorro || LINEAR || — || align=right | 5.9 km || 
|-id=397 bgcolor=#d6d6d6
| 218397 ||  || — || August 11, 2004 || Socorro || LINEAR || EOS || align=right | 3.2 km || 
|-id=398 bgcolor=#d6d6d6
| 218398 || 2004 QY || — || August 16, 2004 || Palomar || NEAT || EOS || align=right | 4.0 km || 
|-id=399 bgcolor=#d6d6d6
| 218399 ||  || — || August 21, 2004 || Reedy Creek || J. Broughton || — || align=right | 5.4 km || 
|-id=400 bgcolor=#d6d6d6
| 218400 Marquardt ||  ||  || August 22, 2004 || Altschwendt || W. Ries || — || align=right | 3.8 km || 
|}

218401–218500 

|-bgcolor=#d6d6d6
| 218401 ||  || — || August 22, 2004 || Altschwendt || Altschwendt Obs. || EOS || align=right | 2.3 km || 
|-id=402 bgcolor=#FA8072
| 218402 ||  || — || August 20, 2004 || Socorro || LINEAR || H || align=right | 1.0 km || 
|-id=403 bgcolor=#d6d6d6
| 218403 ||  || — || August 19, 2004 || Socorro || LINEAR || — || align=right | 5.7 km || 
|-id=404 bgcolor=#d6d6d6
| 218404 ||  || — || September 4, 2004 || Palomar || NEAT || — || align=right | 5.0 km || 
|-id=405 bgcolor=#d6d6d6
| 218405 ||  || — || September 6, 2004 || Siding Spring || SSS || — || align=right | 3.3 km || 
|-id=406 bgcolor=#d6d6d6
| 218406 ||  || — || September 7, 2004 || Kitt Peak || Spacewatch || — || align=right | 3.0 km || 
|-id=407 bgcolor=#d6d6d6
| 218407 ||  || — || September 8, 2004 || Socorro || LINEAR || — || align=right | 3.0 km || 
|-id=408 bgcolor=#d6d6d6
| 218408 ||  || — || September 8, 2004 || Socorro || LINEAR || — || align=right | 4.1 km || 
|-id=409 bgcolor=#d6d6d6
| 218409 ||  || — || September 8, 2004 || Socorro || LINEAR || TEL || align=right | 2.5 km || 
|-id=410 bgcolor=#d6d6d6
| 218410 ||  || — || September 8, 2004 || Socorro || LINEAR || — || align=right | 5.5 km || 
|-id=411 bgcolor=#d6d6d6
| 218411 ||  || — || September 8, 2004 || Socorro || LINEAR || EOS || align=right | 3.3 km || 
|-id=412 bgcolor=#d6d6d6
| 218412 ||  || — || September 8, 2004 || Socorro || LINEAR || — || align=right | 3.2 km || 
|-id=413 bgcolor=#d6d6d6
| 218413 ||  || — || September 7, 2004 || Palomar || NEAT || — || align=right | 5.5 km || 
|-id=414 bgcolor=#d6d6d6
| 218414 ||  || — || September 8, 2004 || Socorro || LINEAR || EOS || align=right | 6.1 km || 
|-id=415 bgcolor=#d6d6d6
| 218415 ||  || — || September 8, 2004 || Palomar || NEAT || EOS || align=right | 3.4 km || 
|-id=416 bgcolor=#d6d6d6
| 218416 ||  || — || September 8, 2004 || Palomar || NEAT || — || align=right | 4.9 km || 
|-id=417 bgcolor=#d6d6d6
| 218417 ||  || — || September 8, 2004 || Palomar || NEAT || — || align=right | 5.2 km || 
|-id=418 bgcolor=#d6d6d6
| 218418 ||  || — || September 7, 2004 || Palomar || NEAT || — || align=right | 5.2 km || 
|-id=419 bgcolor=#d6d6d6
| 218419 ||  || — || September 7, 2004 || Kitt Peak || Spacewatch || — || align=right | 2.1 km || 
|-id=420 bgcolor=#d6d6d6
| 218420 ||  || — || September 8, 2004 || Socorro || LINEAR || — || align=right | 4.6 km || 
|-id=421 bgcolor=#d6d6d6
| 218421 ||  || — || September 8, 2004 || Palomar || NEAT || — || align=right | 4.7 km || 
|-id=422 bgcolor=#d6d6d6
| 218422 ||  || — || September 9, 2004 || Socorro || LINEAR || KOR || align=right | 2.1 km || 
|-id=423 bgcolor=#d6d6d6
| 218423 ||  || — || September 10, 2004 || Socorro || LINEAR || — || align=right | 3.9 km || 
|-id=424 bgcolor=#d6d6d6
| 218424 ||  || — || September 10, 2004 || Socorro || LINEAR || EOS || align=right | 3.3 km || 
|-id=425 bgcolor=#d6d6d6
| 218425 ||  || — || September 10, 2004 || Socorro || LINEAR || — || align=right | 5.0 km || 
|-id=426 bgcolor=#d6d6d6
| 218426 ||  || — || September 10, 2004 || Goodricke-Pigott || R. A. Tucker || THB || align=right | 3.8 km || 
|-id=427 bgcolor=#d6d6d6
| 218427 ||  || — || September 8, 2004 || Palomar || NEAT || — || align=right | 3.9 km || 
|-id=428 bgcolor=#d6d6d6
| 218428 ||  || — || September 10, 2004 || Socorro || LINEAR || — || align=right | 4.3 km || 
|-id=429 bgcolor=#d6d6d6
| 218429 ||  || — || September 10, 2004 || Socorro || LINEAR || — || align=right | 4.5 km || 
|-id=430 bgcolor=#d6d6d6
| 218430 ||  || — || September 10, 2004 || Socorro || LINEAR || — || align=right | 4.3 km || 
|-id=431 bgcolor=#d6d6d6
| 218431 ||  || — || September 10, 2004 || Socorro || LINEAR || EOS || align=right | 3.5 km || 
|-id=432 bgcolor=#d6d6d6
| 218432 ||  || — || September 10, 2004 || Socorro || LINEAR || — || align=right | 4.5 km || 
|-id=433 bgcolor=#d6d6d6
| 218433 ||  || — || September 10, 2004 || Socorro || LINEAR || — || align=right | 4.9 km || 
|-id=434 bgcolor=#d6d6d6
| 218434 ||  || — || September 10, 2004 || Socorro || LINEAR || — || align=right | 5.4 km || 
|-id=435 bgcolor=#d6d6d6
| 218435 ||  || — || September 10, 2004 || Socorro || LINEAR || — || align=right | 5.2 km || 
|-id=436 bgcolor=#d6d6d6
| 218436 ||  || — || September 10, 2004 || Socorro || LINEAR || — || align=right | 4.7 km || 
|-id=437 bgcolor=#d6d6d6
| 218437 ||  || — || September 10, 2004 || Socorro || LINEAR || EOS || align=right | 3.2 km || 
|-id=438 bgcolor=#d6d6d6
| 218438 ||  || — || September 10, 2004 || Socorro || LINEAR || — || align=right | 5.5 km || 
|-id=439 bgcolor=#d6d6d6
| 218439 ||  || — || September 10, 2004 || Socorro || LINEAR || — || align=right | 6.9 km || 
|-id=440 bgcolor=#d6d6d6
| 218440 ||  || — || September 10, 2004 || Socorro || LINEAR || — || align=right | 5.3 km || 
|-id=441 bgcolor=#d6d6d6
| 218441 ||  || — || September 10, 2004 || Socorro || LINEAR || — || align=right | 4.0 km || 
|-id=442 bgcolor=#d6d6d6
| 218442 ||  || — || September 10, 2004 || Socorro || LINEAR || EOS || align=right | 3.7 km || 
|-id=443 bgcolor=#fefefe
| 218443 ||  || — || September 10, 2004 || Socorro || LINEAR || — || align=right | 1.2 km || 
|-id=444 bgcolor=#d6d6d6
| 218444 ||  || — || September 10, 2004 || Socorro || LINEAR || — || align=right | 5.6 km || 
|-id=445 bgcolor=#d6d6d6
| 218445 ||  || — || September 11, 2004 || Socorro || LINEAR || — || align=right | 5.8 km || 
|-id=446 bgcolor=#d6d6d6
| 218446 ||  || — || September 11, 2004 || Socorro || LINEAR || — || align=right | 5.4 km || 
|-id=447 bgcolor=#d6d6d6
| 218447 ||  || — || September 11, 2004 || Socorro || LINEAR || — || align=right | 5.4 km || 
|-id=448 bgcolor=#d6d6d6
| 218448 ||  || — || September 11, 2004 || Socorro || LINEAR || — || align=right | 5.0 km || 
|-id=449 bgcolor=#d6d6d6
| 218449 ||  || — || September 11, 2004 || Socorro || LINEAR || — || align=right | 5.2 km || 
|-id=450 bgcolor=#d6d6d6
| 218450 ||  || — || September 11, 2004 || Socorro || LINEAR || TIR || align=right | 5.0 km || 
|-id=451 bgcolor=#fefefe
| 218451 ||  || — || September 11, 2004 || Socorro || LINEAR || H || align=right | 1.3 km || 
|-id=452 bgcolor=#d6d6d6
| 218452 ||  || — || September 11, 2004 || Socorro || LINEAR || ALA || align=right | 5.7 km || 
|-id=453 bgcolor=#d6d6d6
| 218453 ||  || — || September 9, 2004 || Kitt Peak || Spacewatch || — || align=right | 4.6 km || 
|-id=454 bgcolor=#d6d6d6
| 218454 ||  || — || September 9, 2004 || Kitt Peak || Spacewatch || — || align=right | 4.1 km || 
|-id=455 bgcolor=#d6d6d6
| 218455 ||  || — || September 9, 2004 || Kitt Peak || Spacewatch || — || align=right | 4.0 km || 
|-id=456 bgcolor=#d6d6d6
| 218456 ||  || — || September 10, 2004 || Kitt Peak || Spacewatch || VER || align=right | 4.6 km || 
|-id=457 bgcolor=#d6d6d6
| 218457 ||  || — || September 13, 2004 || Socorro || LINEAR || — || align=right | 5.6 km || 
|-id=458 bgcolor=#d6d6d6
| 218458 ||  || — || September 14, 2004 || Palomar || NEAT || — || align=right | 3.8 km || 
|-id=459 bgcolor=#d6d6d6
| 218459 ||  || — || September 11, 2004 || Kitt Peak || Spacewatch || KAR || align=right | 1.5 km || 
|-id=460 bgcolor=#d6d6d6
| 218460 ||  || — || September 13, 2004 || Palomar || NEAT || EOS || align=right | 2.6 km || 
|-id=461 bgcolor=#fefefe
| 218461 ||  || — || September 13, 2004 || Socorro || LINEAR || H || align=right | 1.3 km || 
|-id=462 bgcolor=#d6d6d6
| 218462 ||  || — || September 13, 2004 || Palomar || NEAT || — || align=right | 5.6 km || 
|-id=463 bgcolor=#d6d6d6
| 218463 ||  || — || September 13, 2004 || Palomar || NEAT || — || align=right | 3.5 km || 
|-id=464 bgcolor=#d6d6d6
| 218464 ||  || — || September 13, 2004 || Socorro || LINEAR || — || align=right | 4.1 km || 
|-id=465 bgcolor=#d6d6d6
| 218465 ||  || — || September 13, 2004 || Socorro || LINEAR || — || align=right | 4.6 km || 
|-id=466 bgcolor=#d6d6d6
| 218466 ||  || — || September 13, 2004 || Socorro || LINEAR || — || align=right | 5.3 km || 
|-id=467 bgcolor=#d6d6d6
| 218467 ||  || — || September 15, 2004 || Anderson Mesa || LONEOS || HYG || align=right | 3.9 km || 
|-id=468 bgcolor=#d6d6d6
| 218468 ||  || — || September 15, 2004 || Kitt Peak || Spacewatch || — || align=right | 4.5 km || 
|-id=469 bgcolor=#d6d6d6
| 218469 ||  || — || September 15, 2004 || Anderson Mesa || LONEOS || — || align=right | 3.3 km || 
|-id=470 bgcolor=#d6d6d6
| 218470 ||  || — || September 10, 2004 || Socorro || LINEAR || — || align=right | 3.3 km || 
|-id=471 bgcolor=#d6d6d6
| 218471 ||  || — || September 17, 2004 || Anderson Mesa || LONEOS || — || align=right | 4.7 km || 
|-id=472 bgcolor=#d6d6d6
| 218472 ||  || — || September 17, 2004 || Socorro || LINEAR || — || align=right | 4.5 km || 
|-id=473 bgcolor=#E9E9E9
| 218473 ||  || — || September 17, 2004 || Kitt Peak || Spacewatch || — || align=right | 2.8 km || 
|-id=474 bgcolor=#d6d6d6
| 218474 ||  || — || September 18, 2004 || Socorro || LINEAR || — || align=right | 5.1 km || 
|-id=475 bgcolor=#d6d6d6
| 218475 ||  || — || September 18, 2004 || Socorro || LINEAR || — || align=right | 4.1 km || 
|-id=476 bgcolor=#d6d6d6
| 218476 ||  || — || September 18, 2004 || Socorro || LINEAR || MEL || align=right | 5.5 km || 
|-id=477 bgcolor=#d6d6d6
| 218477 ||  || — || September 18, 2004 || Socorro || LINEAR || — || align=right | 5.0 km || 
|-id=478 bgcolor=#fefefe
| 218478 ||  || — || September 21, 2004 || Socorro || LINEAR || H || align=right data-sort-value="0.99" | 990 m || 
|-id=479 bgcolor=#d6d6d6
| 218479 ||  || — || September 22, 2004 || Socorro || LINEAR || EOS || align=right | 3.2 km || 
|-id=480 bgcolor=#d6d6d6
| 218480 ||  || — || September 16, 2004 || Anderson Mesa || LONEOS || — || align=right | 4.6 km || 
|-id=481 bgcolor=#d6d6d6
| 218481 ||  || — || September 16, 2004 || Anderson Mesa || LONEOS || THM || align=right | 3.4 km || 
|-id=482 bgcolor=#d6d6d6
| 218482 ||  || — || October 4, 2004 || Goodricke-Pigott || R. A. Tucker || — || align=right | 3.9 km || 
|-id=483 bgcolor=#d6d6d6
| 218483 ||  || — || October 5, 2004 || Goodricke-Pigott || R. A. Tucker || — || align=right | 3.3 km || 
|-id=484 bgcolor=#d6d6d6
| 218484 ||  || — || October 7, 2004 || Goodricke-Pigott || R. A. Tucker || — || align=right | 4.1 km || 
|-id=485 bgcolor=#fefefe
| 218485 ||  || — || October 9, 2004 || Socorro || LINEAR || H || align=right data-sort-value="0.86" | 860 m || 
|-id=486 bgcolor=#d6d6d6
| 218486 ||  || — || October 9, 2004 || Anderson Mesa || LONEOS || — || align=right | 5.7 km || 
|-id=487 bgcolor=#d6d6d6
| 218487 ||  || — || October 4, 2004 || Kitt Peak || Spacewatch || — || align=right | 3.7 km || 
|-id=488 bgcolor=#d6d6d6
| 218488 ||  || — || October 4, 2004 || Socorro || LINEAR || — || align=right | 5.9 km || 
|-id=489 bgcolor=#d6d6d6
| 218489 ||  || — || October 4, 2004 || Kitt Peak || Spacewatch || VER || align=right | 4.7 km || 
|-id=490 bgcolor=#d6d6d6
| 218490 ||  || — || October 4, 2004 || Kitt Peak || Spacewatch || — || align=right | 5.1 km || 
|-id=491 bgcolor=#d6d6d6
| 218491 ||  || — || October 4, 2004 || Kitt Peak || Spacewatch || — || align=right | 4.4 km || 
|-id=492 bgcolor=#d6d6d6
| 218492 ||  || — || October 4, 2004 || Kitt Peak || Spacewatch || THM || align=right | 2.9 km || 
|-id=493 bgcolor=#d6d6d6
| 218493 ||  || — || October 4, 2004 || Kitt Peak || Spacewatch || — || align=right | 4.3 km || 
|-id=494 bgcolor=#d6d6d6
| 218494 ||  || — || October 5, 2004 || Kitt Peak || Spacewatch || — || align=right | 2.8 km || 
|-id=495 bgcolor=#d6d6d6
| 218495 ||  || — || October 5, 2004 || Kitt Peak || Spacewatch || — || align=right | 4.0 km || 
|-id=496 bgcolor=#d6d6d6
| 218496 ||  || — || October 5, 2004 || Anderson Mesa || LONEOS || — || align=right | 4.5 km || 
|-id=497 bgcolor=#d6d6d6
| 218497 ||  || — || October 5, 2004 || Anderson Mesa || LONEOS || — || align=right | 3.9 km || 
|-id=498 bgcolor=#d6d6d6
| 218498 ||  || — || October 6, 2004 || Kitt Peak || Spacewatch || THM || align=right | 3.1 km || 
|-id=499 bgcolor=#d6d6d6
| 218499 ||  || — || October 6, 2004 || Kitt Peak || Spacewatch || — || align=right | 3.5 km || 
|-id=500 bgcolor=#d6d6d6
| 218500 ||  || — || October 13, 2004 || Socorro || LINEAR || — || align=right | 5.3 km || 
|}

218501–218600 

|-bgcolor=#d6d6d6
| 218501 ||  || — || October 5, 2004 || Kitt Peak || Spacewatch || — || align=right | 3.8 km || 
|-id=502 bgcolor=#d6d6d6
| 218502 ||  || — || October 5, 2004 || Kitt Peak || Spacewatch || — || align=right | 3.2 km || 
|-id=503 bgcolor=#d6d6d6
| 218503 ||  || — || October 5, 2004 || Kitt Peak || Spacewatch || HYG || align=right | 3.4 km || 
|-id=504 bgcolor=#d6d6d6
| 218504 ||  || — || October 5, 2004 || Kitt Peak || Spacewatch || — || align=right | 2.9 km || 
|-id=505 bgcolor=#d6d6d6
| 218505 ||  || — || October 5, 2004 || Palomar || NEAT || — || align=right | 5.3 km || 
|-id=506 bgcolor=#d6d6d6
| 218506 ||  || — || October 7, 2004 || Kitt Peak || Spacewatch || EOS || align=right | 3.1 km || 
|-id=507 bgcolor=#d6d6d6
| 218507 ||  || — || October 7, 2004 || Anderson Mesa || LONEOS || — || align=right | 5.2 km || 
|-id=508 bgcolor=#d6d6d6
| 218508 ||  || — || October 7, 2004 || Socorro || LINEAR || — || align=right | 4.4 km || 
|-id=509 bgcolor=#d6d6d6
| 218509 ||  || — || October 7, 2004 || Socorro || LINEAR || — || align=right | 4.1 km || 
|-id=510 bgcolor=#d6d6d6
| 218510 ||  || — || October 7, 2004 || Socorro || LINEAR || — || align=right | 4.2 km || 
|-id=511 bgcolor=#d6d6d6
| 218511 ||  || — || October 7, 2004 || Socorro || LINEAR || — || align=right | 4.3 km || 
|-id=512 bgcolor=#d6d6d6
| 218512 ||  || — || October 7, 2004 || Palomar || NEAT || — || align=right | 5.5 km || 
|-id=513 bgcolor=#d6d6d6
| 218513 ||  || — || October 7, 2004 || Anderson Mesa || LONEOS || — || align=right | 3.3 km || 
|-id=514 bgcolor=#d6d6d6
| 218514 ||  || — || October 7, 2004 || Anderson Mesa || LONEOS || — || align=right | 4.9 km || 
|-id=515 bgcolor=#d6d6d6
| 218515 ||  || — || October 8, 2004 || Anderson Mesa || LONEOS || EOS || align=right | 3.4 km || 
|-id=516 bgcolor=#d6d6d6
| 218516 ||  || — || October 7, 2004 || Socorro || LINEAR || HYG || align=right | 4.1 km || 
|-id=517 bgcolor=#d6d6d6
| 218517 ||  || — || October 7, 2004 || Kitt Peak || Spacewatch || — || align=right | 4.2 km || 
|-id=518 bgcolor=#d6d6d6
| 218518 ||  || — || October 8, 2004 || Kitt Peak || Spacewatch || — || align=right | 4.0 km || 
|-id=519 bgcolor=#d6d6d6
| 218519 ||  || — || October 9, 2004 || Kitt Peak || Spacewatch || — || align=right | 4.2 km || 
|-id=520 bgcolor=#d6d6d6
| 218520 ||  || — || October 6, 2004 || Socorro || LINEAR || TIR || align=right | 4.4 km || 
|-id=521 bgcolor=#d6d6d6
| 218521 ||  || — || October 9, 2004 || Kitt Peak || Spacewatch || — || align=right | 3.4 km || 
|-id=522 bgcolor=#d6d6d6
| 218522 ||  || — || October 9, 2004 || Kitt Peak || Spacewatch || — || align=right | 3.9 km || 
|-id=523 bgcolor=#d6d6d6
| 218523 ||  || — || October 9, 2004 || Kitt Peak || Spacewatch || — || align=right | 4.8 km || 
|-id=524 bgcolor=#d6d6d6
| 218524 ||  || — || October 9, 2004 || Kitt Peak || Spacewatch || HYG || align=right | 4.3 km || 
|-id=525 bgcolor=#d6d6d6
| 218525 ||  || — || October 8, 2004 || Socorro || LINEAR || — || align=right | 5.6 km || 
|-id=526 bgcolor=#d6d6d6
| 218526 ||  || — || October 10, 2004 || Socorro || LINEAR || — || align=right | 5.3 km || 
|-id=527 bgcolor=#d6d6d6
| 218527 ||  || — || October 10, 2004 || Socorro || LINEAR || EOS || align=right | 3.6 km || 
|-id=528 bgcolor=#d6d6d6
| 218528 ||  || — || October 13, 2004 || Kitt Peak || Spacewatch || — || align=right | 2.8 km || 
|-id=529 bgcolor=#d6d6d6
| 218529 ||  || — || October 10, 2004 || Kitt Peak || Spacewatch || — || align=right | 3.5 km || 
|-id=530 bgcolor=#d6d6d6
| 218530 ||  || — || October 7, 2004 || Socorro || LINEAR || AEG || align=right | 4.4 km || 
|-id=531 bgcolor=#d6d6d6
| 218531 ||  || — || October 9, 2004 || Socorro || LINEAR || EUP || align=right | 6.0 km || 
|-id=532 bgcolor=#d6d6d6
| 218532 ||  || — || October 4, 2004 || Anderson Mesa || LONEOS || EOS || align=right | 3.3 km || 
|-id=533 bgcolor=#d6d6d6
| 218533 ||  || — || October 21, 2004 || Socorro || LINEAR || — || align=right | 4.8 km || 
|-id=534 bgcolor=#d6d6d6
| 218534 ||  || — || November 3, 2004 || Anderson Mesa || LONEOS || — || align=right | 3.0 km || 
|-id=535 bgcolor=#d6d6d6
| 218535 ||  || — || November 3, 2004 || Palomar || NEAT || — || align=right | 4.5 km || 
|-id=536 bgcolor=#d6d6d6
| 218536 ||  || — || November 5, 2004 || Palomar || NEAT || — || align=right | 4.2 km || 
|-id=537 bgcolor=#d6d6d6
| 218537 ||  || — || November 4, 2004 || Kitt Peak || Spacewatch || 7:4 || align=right | 8.2 km || 
|-id=538 bgcolor=#d6d6d6
| 218538 ||  || — || November 4, 2004 || Catalina || CSS || — || align=right | 7.1 km || 
|-id=539 bgcolor=#d6d6d6
| 218539 ||  || — || November 5, 2004 || Palomar || NEAT || HYG || align=right | 5.5 km || 
|-id=540 bgcolor=#d6d6d6
| 218540 ||  || — || November 11, 2004 || Catalina || CSS || — || align=right | 4.2 km || 
|-id=541 bgcolor=#fefefe
| 218541 ||  || — || November 11, 2004 || Kitt Peak || Spacewatch || H || align=right | 1.0 km || 
|-id=542 bgcolor=#fefefe
| 218542 ||  || — || November 18, 2004 || Socorro || LINEAR || H || align=right | 1.4 km || 
|-id=543 bgcolor=#fefefe
| 218543 || 2004 XF || — || December 1, 2004 || Socorro || LINEAR || H || align=right | 1.4 km || 
|-id=544 bgcolor=#d6d6d6
| 218544 ||  || — || December 4, 2004 || Socorro || LINEAR || — || align=right | 7.3 km || 
|-id=545 bgcolor=#d6d6d6
| 218545 ||  || — || December 2, 2004 || Socorro || LINEAR || — || align=right | 4.3 km || 
|-id=546 bgcolor=#fefefe
| 218546 ||  || — || December 13, 2004 || Socorro || LINEAR || H || align=right | 1.0 km || 
|-id=547 bgcolor=#fefefe
| 218547 ||  || — || December 13, 2004 || Anderson Mesa || LONEOS || H || align=right | 1.0 km || 
|-id=548 bgcolor=#d6d6d6
| 218548 ||  || — || December 21, 2004 || Catalina || CSS || EUP || align=right | 4.7 km || 
|-id=549 bgcolor=#fefefe
| 218549 ||  || — || January 12, 2005 || Socorro || LINEAR || H || align=right | 1.5 km || 
|-id=550 bgcolor=#fefefe
| 218550 ||  || — || January 19, 2005 || Socorro || LINEAR || H || align=right | 1.0 km || 
|-id=551 bgcolor=#fefefe
| 218551 ||  || — || February 4, 2005 || Kitt Peak || Spacewatch || — || align=right data-sort-value="0.96" | 960 m || 
|-id=552 bgcolor=#fefefe
| 218552 ||  || — || March 3, 2005 || Catalina || CSS || — || align=right | 1.7 km || 
|-id=553 bgcolor=#d6d6d6
| 218553 ||  || — || March 1, 2005 || Catalina || CSS || — || align=right | 5.4 km || 
|-id=554 bgcolor=#fefefe
| 218554 ||  || — || March 4, 2005 || Catalina || CSS || — || align=right | 3.1 km || 
|-id=555 bgcolor=#fefefe
| 218555 ||  || — || March 9, 2005 || Socorro || LINEAR || FLO || align=right data-sort-value="0.86" | 860 m || 
|-id=556 bgcolor=#fefefe
| 218556 ||  || — || March 10, 2005 || Mount Lemmon || Mount Lemmon Survey || FLO || align=right data-sort-value="0.88" | 880 m || 
|-id=557 bgcolor=#fefefe
| 218557 ||  || — || March 10, 2005 || Kitt Peak || Spacewatch || — || align=right | 1.0 km || 
|-id=558 bgcolor=#fefefe
| 218558 ||  || — || March 11, 2005 || Mount Lemmon || Mount Lemmon Survey || — || align=right | 1.2 km || 
|-id=559 bgcolor=#fefefe
| 218559 ||  || — || March 11, 2005 || Mount Lemmon || Mount Lemmon Survey || — || align=right data-sort-value="0.81" | 810 m || 
|-id=560 bgcolor=#fefefe
| 218560 ||  || — || March 9, 2005 || Mount Lemmon || Mount Lemmon Survey || — || align=right data-sort-value="0.81" | 810 m || 
|-id=561 bgcolor=#fefefe
| 218561 ||  || — || March 11, 2005 || Kitt Peak || Spacewatch || FLO || align=right data-sort-value="0.77" | 770 m || 
|-id=562 bgcolor=#fefefe
| 218562 ||  || — || March 13, 2005 || Kitt Peak || Spacewatch || — || align=right data-sort-value="0.99" | 990 m || 
|-id=563 bgcolor=#fefefe
| 218563 ||  || — || April 4, 2005 || Catalina || CSS || — || align=right | 1.1 km || 
|-id=564 bgcolor=#fefefe
| 218564 ||  || — || April 3, 2005 || Palomar || NEAT || FLO || align=right data-sort-value="0.98" | 980 m || 
|-id=565 bgcolor=#fefefe
| 218565 ||  || — || April 9, 2005 || Mount Lemmon || Mount Lemmon Survey || — || align=right data-sort-value="0.87" | 870 m || 
|-id=566 bgcolor=#fefefe
| 218566 ||  || — || April 9, 2005 || Socorro || LINEAR || — || align=right | 1.3 km || 
|-id=567 bgcolor=#fefefe
| 218567 ||  || — || April 9, 2005 || Socorro || LINEAR || — || align=right | 1.4 km || 
|-id=568 bgcolor=#fefefe
| 218568 ||  || — || April 8, 2005 || Socorro || LINEAR || — || align=right | 1.00 km || 
|-id=569 bgcolor=#fefefe
| 218569 ||  || — || April 12, 2005 || Kitt Peak || Spacewatch || — || align=right | 2.2 km || 
|-id=570 bgcolor=#fefefe
| 218570 ||  || — || April 10, 2005 || Kitt Peak || M. W. Buie || — || align=right data-sort-value="0.79" | 790 m || 
|-id=571 bgcolor=#E9E9E9
| 218571 ||  || — || May 4, 2005 || Kitt Peak || Spacewatch || — || align=right | 2.5 km || 
|-id=572 bgcolor=#fefefe
| 218572 ||  || — || May 4, 2005 || Kitt Peak || Spacewatch || PHO || align=right | 1.8 km || 
|-id=573 bgcolor=#fefefe
| 218573 ||  || — || May 3, 2005 || Kitt Peak || Spacewatch || — || align=right data-sort-value="0.95" | 950 m || 
|-id=574 bgcolor=#d6d6d6
| 218574 ||  || — || May 3, 2005 || Socorro || LINEAR || HYG || align=right | 3.9 km || 
|-id=575 bgcolor=#fefefe
| 218575 ||  || — || May 4, 2005 || Kitt Peak || Spacewatch || — || align=right | 1.2 km || 
|-id=576 bgcolor=#fefefe
| 218576 ||  || — || May 7, 2005 || Kitt Peak || Spacewatch || — || align=right | 1.4 km || 
|-id=577 bgcolor=#fefefe
| 218577 ||  || — || May 6, 2005 || Mount Lemmon || Mount Lemmon Survey || — || align=right data-sort-value="0.91" | 910 m || 
|-id=578 bgcolor=#fefefe
| 218578 ||  || — || May 8, 2005 || Siding Spring || SSS || — || align=right | 1.2 km || 
|-id=579 bgcolor=#fefefe
| 218579 ||  || — || May 9, 2005 || Catalina || CSS || — || align=right | 1.3 km || 
|-id=580 bgcolor=#fefefe
| 218580 ||  || — || May 10, 2005 || Kitt Peak || Spacewatch || — || align=right data-sort-value="0.92" | 920 m || 
|-id=581 bgcolor=#fefefe
| 218581 ||  || — || May 12, 2005 || Catalina || CSS || — || align=right | 1.9 km || 
|-id=582 bgcolor=#fefefe
| 218582 ||  || — || May 1, 2005 || Palomar || NEAT || — || align=right data-sort-value="0.95" | 950 m || 
|-id=583 bgcolor=#fefefe
| 218583 || 2005 KD || — || May 16, 2005 || Reedy Creek || J. Broughton || ERI || align=right | 1.9 km || 
|-id=584 bgcolor=#fefefe
| 218584 ||  || — || May 18, 2005 || Palomar || NEAT || FLO || align=right data-sort-value="0.82" | 820 m || 
|-id=585 bgcolor=#fefefe
| 218585 ||  || — || May 28, 2005 || Reedy Creek || J. Broughton || — || align=right | 1.3 km || 
|-id=586 bgcolor=#fefefe
| 218586 ||  || — || May 29, 2005 || Siding Spring || SSS || MAS || align=right data-sort-value="0.91" | 910 m || 
|-id=587 bgcolor=#fefefe
| 218587 ||  || — || June 8, 2005 || Kitt Peak || Spacewatch || — || align=right | 1.1 km || 
|-id=588 bgcolor=#fefefe
| 218588 ||  || — || June 12, 2005 || Kitt Peak || Spacewatch || MAS || align=right | 1.0 km || 
|-id=589 bgcolor=#fefefe
| 218589 ||  || — || June 12, 2005 || Kitt Peak || Spacewatch || NYS || align=right data-sort-value="0.96" | 960 m || 
|-id=590 bgcolor=#fefefe
| 218590 ||  || — || June 14, 2005 || Kitt Peak || Spacewatch || NYS || align=right | 1.0 km || 
|-id=591 bgcolor=#fefefe
| 218591 ||  || — || June 13, 2005 || Campo Imperatore || CINEOS || NYS || align=right | 1.1 km || 
|-id=592 bgcolor=#fefefe
| 218592 ||  || — || June 30, 2005 || Kitt Peak || Spacewatch || — || align=right | 1.3 km || 
|-id=593 bgcolor=#fefefe
| 218593 ||  || — || June 28, 2005 || Palomar || NEAT || — || align=right | 1.5 km || 
|-id=594 bgcolor=#fefefe
| 218594 ||  || — || June 30, 2005 || Kitt Peak || Spacewatch || — || align=right | 1.3 km || 
|-id=595 bgcolor=#fefefe
| 218595 ||  || — || June 30, 2005 || Kitt Peak || Spacewatch || — || align=right | 1.2 km || 
|-id=596 bgcolor=#E9E9E9
| 218596 ||  || — || June 30, 2005 || Catalina || CSS || RAF || align=right | 1.7 km || 
|-id=597 bgcolor=#FA8072
| 218597 ||  || — || June 21, 2005 || Palomar || NEAT || — || align=right | 1.4 km || 
|-id=598 bgcolor=#fefefe
| 218598 ||  || — || July 2, 2005 || Kitt Peak || Spacewatch || NYS || align=right data-sort-value="0.92" | 920 m || 
|-id=599 bgcolor=#fefefe
| 218599 ||  || — || July 3, 2005 || Mount Lemmon || Mount Lemmon Survey || MAS || align=right data-sort-value="0.93" | 930 m || 
|-id=600 bgcolor=#fefefe
| 218600 ||  || — || July 10, 2005 || Kitt Peak || Spacewatch || NYS || align=right data-sort-value="0.93" | 930 m || 
|}

218601–218700 

|-bgcolor=#E9E9E9
| 218601 ||  || — || July 11, 2005 || Mayhill || A. Lowe || GER || align=right | 2.0 km || 
|-id=602 bgcolor=#fefefe
| 218602 ||  || — || July 4, 2005 || Kitt Peak || Spacewatch || fast? || align=right | 1.1 km || 
|-id=603 bgcolor=#fefefe
| 218603 ||  || — || July 6, 2005 || Siding Spring || SSS || — || align=right | 1.3 km || 
|-id=604 bgcolor=#fefefe
| 218604 ||  || — || July 10, 2005 || Reedy Creek || J. Broughton || — || align=right | 1.7 km || 
|-id=605 bgcolor=#fefefe
| 218605 ||  || — || July 5, 2005 || Palomar || NEAT || — || align=right | 1.3 km || 
|-id=606 bgcolor=#fefefe
| 218606 ||  || — || July 11, 2005 || Anderson Mesa || LONEOS || NYS || align=right | 1.3 km || 
|-id=607 bgcolor=#fefefe
| 218607 ||  || — || July 4, 2005 || Palomar || NEAT || — || align=right | 1.1 km || 
|-id=608 bgcolor=#E9E9E9
| 218608 ||  || — || July 19, 2005 || Palomar || NEAT || — || align=right | 1.8 km || 
|-id=609 bgcolor=#FA8072
| 218609 ||  || — || July 26, 2005 || Palomar || NEAT || — || align=right | 1.9 km || 
|-id=610 bgcolor=#fefefe
| 218610 ||  || — || July 30, 2005 || Vicques || M. Ory || V || align=right | 1.1 km || 
|-id=611 bgcolor=#E9E9E9
| 218611 || 2005 PL || — || August 2, 2005 || Kingsnake || J. V. McClusky || — || align=right | 2.8 km || 
|-id=612 bgcolor=#fefefe
| 218612 ||  || — || August 1, 2005 || Siding Spring || SSS || — || align=right | 2.3 km || 
|-id=613 bgcolor=#E9E9E9
| 218613 ||  || — || August 4, 2005 || Palomar || NEAT || — || align=right | 1.2 km || 
|-id=614 bgcolor=#d6d6d6
| 218614 ||  || — || August 4, 2005 || Palomar || NEAT || — || align=right | 4.9 km || 
|-id=615 bgcolor=#E9E9E9
| 218615 ||  || — || August 24, 2005 || Palomar || NEAT || — || align=right | 3.5 km || 
|-id=616 bgcolor=#fefefe
| 218616 ||  || — || August 26, 2005 || Haleakala || NEAT || NYS || align=right | 1.1 km || 
|-id=617 bgcolor=#E9E9E9
| 218617 ||  || — || August 26, 2005 || Anderson Mesa || LONEOS || MAR || align=right | 1.7 km || 
|-id=618 bgcolor=#E9E9E9
| 218618 ||  || — || August 26, 2005 || Palomar || NEAT || NEM || align=right | 3.6 km || 
|-id=619 bgcolor=#E9E9E9
| 218619 ||  || — || August 30, 2005 || Socorro || LINEAR || — || align=right | 3.1 km || 
|-id=620 bgcolor=#fefefe
| 218620 ||  || — || August 24, 2005 || Reedy Creek || J. Broughton || — || align=right | 1.7 km || 
|-id=621 bgcolor=#E9E9E9
| 218621 ||  || — || August 26, 2005 || Anderson Mesa || LONEOS || — || align=right | 1.1 km || 
|-id=622 bgcolor=#E9E9E9
| 218622 ||  || — || August 27, 2005 || Palomar || NEAT || — || align=right data-sort-value="0.90" | 900 m || 
|-id=623 bgcolor=#E9E9E9
| 218623 ||  || — || August 27, 2005 || Palomar || NEAT || MAR || align=right | 1.2 km || 
|-id=624 bgcolor=#E9E9E9
| 218624 ||  || — || August 28, 2005 || Kitt Peak || Spacewatch || — || align=right | 1.2 km || 
|-id=625 bgcolor=#E9E9E9
| 218625 ||  || — || August 27, 2005 || Campo Imperatore || CINEOS || — || align=right | 2.4 km || 
|-id=626 bgcolor=#E9E9E9
| 218626 ||  || — || August 29, 2005 || Palomar || NEAT || — || align=right | 2.0 km || 
|-id=627 bgcolor=#E9E9E9
| 218627 ||  || — || August 26, 2005 || Palomar || NEAT || HNS || align=right | 2.0 km || 
|-id=628 bgcolor=#E9E9E9
| 218628 ||  || — || August 31, 2005 || Palomar || NEAT || EUN || align=right | 1.5 km || 
|-id=629 bgcolor=#E9E9E9
| 218629 ||  || — || September 6, 2005 || Bergisch Gladbach || W. Bickel || — || align=right | 2.4 km || 
|-id=630 bgcolor=#E9E9E9
| 218630 ||  || — || September 1, 2005 || Kitt Peak || Spacewatch || — || align=right | 1.8 km || 
|-id=631 bgcolor=#E9E9E9
| 218631 ||  || — || September 11, 2005 || Anderson Mesa || LONEOS || JUN || align=right | 2.1 km || 
|-id=632 bgcolor=#E9E9E9
| 218632 ||  || — || September 11, 2005 || Anderson Mesa || LONEOS || — || align=right | 4.4 km || 
|-id=633 bgcolor=#E9E9E9
| 218633 ||  || — || September 8, 2005 || Socorro || LINEAR || — || align=right | 1.5 km || 
|-id=634 bgcolor=#E9E9E9
| 218634 ||  || — || September 13, 2005 || Anderson Mesa || LONEOS || — || align=right | 3.4 km || 
|-id=635 bgcolor=#E9E9E9
| 218635 ||  || — || September 13, 2005 || Socorro || LINEAR || ADE || align=right | 3.0 km || 
|-id=636 bgcolor=#E9E9E9
| 218636 Calabria ||  ||  || September 24, 2005 || Vallemare di Borbona || V. S. Casulli || — || align=right | 2.8 km || 
|-id=637 bgcolor=#E9E9E9
| 218637 ||  || — || September 26, 2005 || Kitt Peak || Spacewatch || — || align=right | 1.8 km || 
|-id=638 bgcolor=#E9E9E9
| 218638 ||  || — || September 26, 2005 || Kitt Peak || Spacewatch || — || align=right | 1.0 km || 
|-id=639 bgcolor=#E9E9E9
| 218639 ||  || — || September 25, 2005 || Calvin-Rehoboth || Calvin–Rehoboth Obs. || — || align=right | 1.8 km || 
|-id=640 bgcolor=#E9E9E9
| 218640 ||  || — || September 23, 2005 || Catalina || CSS || — || align=right | 3.0 km || 
|-id=641 bgcolor=#E9E9E9
| 218641 ||  || — || September 25, 2005 || Palomar || NEAT || — || align=right | 2.3 km || 
|-id=642 bgcolor=#E9E9E9
| 218642 ||  || — || September 23, 2005 || Kitt Peak || Spacewatch || — || align=right | 1.9 km || 
|-id=643 bgcolor=#E9E9E9
| 218643 ||  || — || September 24, 2005 || Kitt Peak || Spacewatch || — || align=right | 1.2 km || 
|-id=644 bgcolor=#E9E9E9
| 218644 ||  || — || September 24, 2005 || Kitt Peak || Spacewatch || ADE || align=right | 2.7 km || 
|-id=645 bgcolor=#E9E9E9
| 218645 ||  || — || September 25, 2005 || Kitt Peak || Spacewatch || — || align=right | 2.3 km || 
|-id=646 bgcolor=#E9E9E9
| 218646 ||  || — || September 26, 2005 || Palomar || NEAT || — || align=right | 1.8 km || 
|-id=647 bgcolor=#E9E9E9
| 218647 ||  || — || September 24, 2005 || Kitt Peak || Spacewatch || — || align=right | 2.4 km || 
|-id=648 bgcolor=#E9E9E9
| 218648 ||  || — || September 24, 2005 || Kitt Peak || Spacewatch || MIS || align=right | 3.6 km || 
|-id=649 bgcolor=#E9E9E9
| 218649 ||  || — || September 25, 2005 || Palomar || NEAT || — || align=right | 2.6 km || 
|-id=650 bgcolor=#E9E9E9
| 218650 ||  || — || September 25, 2005 || Palomar || NEAT || — || align=right | 1.8 km || 
|-id=651 bgcolor=#E9E9E9
| 218651 ||  || — || September 28, 2005 || Palomar || NEAT || ADE || align=right | 2.5 km || 
|-id=652 bgcolor=#E9E9E9
| 218652 ||  || — || September 29, 2005 || Palomar || NEAT || RAF || align=right | 1.1 km || 
|-id=653 bgcolor=#E9E9E9
| 218653 ||  || — || September 30, 2005 || Wrightwood || J. W. Young || — || align=right | 2.6 km || 
|-id=654 bgcolor=#E9E9E9
| 218654 ||  || — || September 25, 2005 || Kitt Peak || Spacewatch || — || align=right | 1.1 km || 
|-id=655 bgcolor=#E9E9E9
| 218655 ||  || — || September 25, 2005 || Kitt Peak || Spacewatch || — || align=right | 2.3 km || 
|-id=656 bgcolor=#E9E9E9
| 218656 ||  || — || September 25, 2005 || Palomar || NEAT || — || align=right | 2.6 km || 
|-id=657 bgcolor=#d6d6d6
| 218657 ||  || — || September 26, 2005 || Kitt Peak || Spacewatch || KOR || align=right | 1.8 km || 
|-id=658 bgcolor=#E9E9E9
| 218658 ||  || — || September 26, 2005 || Palomar || NEAT || — || align=right | 3.7 km || 
|-id=659 bgcolor=#E9E9E9
| 218659 ||  || — || September 26, 2005 || Kitt Peak || Spacewatch || — || align=right | 2.0 km || 
|-id=660 bgcolor=#E9E9E9
| 218660 ||  || — || September 27, 2005 || Palomar || NEAT || KRM || align=right | 4.1 km || 
|-id=661 bgcolor=#E9E9E9
| 218661 ||  || — || September 29, 2005 || Kitt Peak || Spacewatch || — || align=right | 1.0 km || 
|-id=662 bgcolor=#E9E9E9
| 218662 ||  || — || September 30, 2005 || Anderson Mesa || LONEOS || — || align=right | 1.4 km || 
|-id=663 bgcolor=#E9E9E9
| 218663 ||  || — || September 30, 2005 || Anderson Mesa || LONEOS || — || align=right | 2.5 km || 
|-id=664 bgcolor=#E9E9E9
| 218664 ||  || — || September 30, 2005 || Mount Lemmon || Mount Lemmon Survey || — || align=right | 3.1 km || 
|-id=665 bgcolor=#E9E9E9
| 218665 ||  || — || September 30, 2005 || Catalina || CSS || JUN || align=right | 1.7 km || 
|-id=666 bgcolor=#E9E9E9
| 218666 ||  || — || September 30, 2005 || Catalina || CSS || RAF || align=right | 1.3 km || 
|-id=667 bgcolor=#E9E9E9
| 218667 ||  || — || September 30, 2005 || Palomar || NEAT || — || align=right | 2.1 km || 
|-id=668 bgcolor=#E9E9E9
| 218668 ||  || — || September 29, 2005 || Catalina || CSS || EUN || align=right | 1.9 km || 
|-id=669 bgcolor=#E9E9E9
| 218669 ||  || — || September 29, 2005 || Catalina || CSS || — || align=right | 2.1 km || 
|-id=670 bgcolor=#E9E9E9
| 218670 ||  || — || September 29, 2005 || Catalina || CSS || EUN || align=right | 2.1 km || 
|-id=671 bgcolor=#E9E9E9
| 218671 ||  || — || September 29, 2005 || Kitt Peak || Spacewatch || AGN || align=right | 1.5 km || 
|-id=672 bgcolor=#E9E9E9
| 218672 ||  || — || September 30, 2005 || Kitt Peak || Spacewatch || — || align=right | 2.5 km || 
|-id=673 bgcolor=#E9E9E9
| 218673 ||  || — || September 30, 2005 || Kitt Peak || Spacewatch || PAD || align=right | 1.9 km || 
|-id=674 bgcolor=#E9E9E9
| 218674 ||  || — || September 22, 2005 || Palomar || NEAT || — || align=right | 1.2 km || 
|-id=675 bgcolor=#fefefe
| 218675 ||  || — || September 23, 2005 || Catalina || CSS || — || align=right | 1.1 km || 
|-id=676 bgcolor=#E9E9E9
| 218676 ||  || — || September 30, 2005 || Anderson Mesa || LONEOS || — || align=right | 1.5 km || 
|-id=677 bgcolor=#E9E9E9
| 218677 ||  || — || September 23, 2005 || Catalina || CSS || EUN || align=right | 2.1 km || 
|-id=678 bgcolor=#E9E9E9
| 218678 ||  || — || October 1, 2005 || Catalina || CSS || — || align=right | 2.2 km || 
|-id=679 bgcolor=#E9E9E9
| 218679 Sagamorehill ||  ||  || October 3, 2005 || Catalina || R. A. Kowalski || — || align=right | 2.3 km || 
|-id=680 bgcolor=#E9E9E9
| 218680 ||  || — || October 1, 2005 || Kitt Peak || Spacewatch || — || align=right | 2.2 km || 
|-id=681 bgcolor=#E9E9E9
| 218681 ||  || — || October 1, 2005 || Kitt Peak || Spacewatch || — || align=right | 1.9 km || 
|-id=682 bgcolor=#E9E9E9
| 218682 ||  || — || October 1, 2005 || Mount Lemmon || Mount Lemmon Survey || — || align=right | 2.8 km || 
|-id=683 bgcolor=#E9E9E9
| 218683 ||  || — || October 3, 2005 || Socorro || LINEAR || — || align=right | 1.8 km || 
|-id=684 bgcolor=#E9E9E9
| 218684 ||  || — || October 5, 2005 || Socorro || LINEAR || CLO || align=right | 2.7 km || 
|-id=685 bgcolor=#d6d6d6
| 218685 ||  || — || October 12, 2005 || Uccle || T. Pauwels || — || align=right | 4.5 km || 
|-id=686 bgcolor=#E9E9E9
| 218686 ||  || — || October 1, 2005 || Catalina || CSS || — || align=right | 1.9 km || 
|-id=687 bgcolor=#E9E9E9
| 218687 ||  || — || October 6, 2005 || Anderson Mesa || LONEOS || WIT || align=right | 1.7 km || 
|-id=688 bgcolor=#E9E9E9
| 218688 ||  || — || October 4, 2005 || Mount Lemmon || Mount Lemmon Survey || — || align=right | 1.7 km || 
|-id=689 bgcolor=#E9E9E9
| 218689 ||  || — || October 7, 2005 || Kitt Peak || Spacewatch || — || align=right | 2.1 km || 
|-id=690 bgcolor=#E9E9E9
| 218690 ||  || — || October 1, 2005 || Catalina || CSS || — || align=right | 2.2 km || 
|-id=691 bgcolor=#E9E9E9
| 218691 ||  || — || October 2, 2005 || Palomar || NEAT || — || align=right | 2.7 km || 
|-id=692 bgcolor=#E9E9E9
| 218692 Leesnyder ||  ||  || October 5, 2005 || Catalina || CSS || EUN || align=right | 1.9 km || 
|-id=693 bgcolor=#E9E9E9
| 218693 ||  || — || October 6, 2005 || Anderson Mesa || LONEOS || MAR || align=right | 2.0 km || 
|-id=694 bgcolor=#E9E9E9
| 218694 ||  || — || October 7, 2005 || Kitt Peak || Spacewatch || — || align=right | 2.9 km || 
|-id=695 bgcolor=#E9E9E9
| 218695 ||  || — || October 7, 2005 || Mount Lemmon || Mount Lemmon Survey || — || align=right | 2.2 km || 
|-id=696 bgcolor=#E9E9E9
| 218696 ||  || — || October 3, 2005 || Socorro || LINEAR || IAN || align=right | 1.9 km || 
|-id=697 bgcolor=#E9E9E9
| 218697 ||  || — || October 7, 2005 || Socorro || LINEAR || 524 || align=right | 1.5 km || 
|-id=698 bgcolor=#E9E9E9
| 218698 ||  || — || October 9, 2005 || Kitt Peak || Spacewatch || — || align=right | 2.7 km || 
|-id=699 bgcolor=#E9E9E9
| 218699 ||  || — || October 9, 2005 || Kitt Peak || Spacewatch || — || align=right | 1.9 km || 
|-id=700 bgcolor=#E9E9E9
| 218700 ||  || — || October 9, 2005 || Kitt Peak || Spacewatch || — || align=right | 2.1 km || 
|}

218701–218800 

|-bgcolor=#E9E9E9
| 218701 ||  || — || October 9, 2005 || Kitt Peak || Spacewatch || HEN || align=right | 1.8 km || 
|-id=702 bgcolor=#E9E9E9
| 218702 ||  || — || October 9, 2005 || Kitt Peak || Spacewatch || — || align=right | 1.8 km || 
|-id=703 bgcolor=#E9E9E9
| 218703 ||  || — || October 3, 2005 || Catalina || CSS || ADE || align=right | 4.5 km || 
|-id=704 bgcolor=#E9E9E9
| 218704 ||  || — || October 3, 2005 || Kitt Peak || Spacewatch || VIB || align=right | 2.7 km || 
|-id=705 bgcolor=#E9E9E9
| 218705 ||  || — || October 1, 2005 || Kitt Peak || Spacewatch || — || align=right | 2.3 km || 
|-id=706 bgcolor=#E9E9E9
| 218706 ||  || — || October 22, 2005 || Socorro || LINEAR || — || align=right | 5.2 km || 
|-id=707 bgcolor=#E9E9E9
| 218707 ||  || — || October 21, 2005 || Palomar || NEAT || — || align=right | 2.9 km || 
|-id=708 bgcolor=#E9E9E9
| 218708 ||  || — || October 22, 2005 || Kitt Peak || Spacewatch || WIT || align=right | 1.5 km || 
|-id=709 bgcolor=#E9E9E9
| 218709 ||  || — || October 22, 2005 || Kitt Peak || Spacewatch || — || align=right | 2.7 km || 
|-id=710 bgcolor=#E9E9E9
| 218710 ||  || — || October 22, 2005 || Catalina || CSS || — || align=right | 2.8 km || 
|-id=711 bgcolor=#E9E9E9
| 218711 ||  || — || October 23, 2005 || Catalina || CSS || — || align=right | 2.1 km || 
|-id=712 bgcolor=#d6d6d6
| 218712 ||  || — || October 24, 2005 || Kitt Peak || Spacewatch || THM || align=right | 3.2 km || 
|-id=713 bgcolor=#E9E9E9
| 218713 ||  || — || October 23, 2005 || Catalina || CSS || WIT || align=right | 1.5 km || 
|-id=714 bgcolor=#E9E9E9
| 218714 ||  || — || October 23, 2005 || Catalina || CSS || — || align=right | 2.2 km || 
|-id=715 bgcolor=#E9E9E9
| 218715 ||  || — || October 24, 2005 || Palomar || NEAT || MAR || align=right | 2.1 km || 
|-id=716 bgcolor=#E9E9E9
| 218716 ||  || — || October 25, 2005 || Kitt Peak || Spacewatch || — || align=right | 1.9 km || 
|-id=717 bgcolor=#E9E9E9
| 218717 ||  || — || October 22, 2005 || Kitt Peak || Spacewatch || AGN || align=right | 1.5 km || 
|-id=718 bgcolor=#E9E9E9
| 218718 ||  || — || October 24, 2005 || Kitt Peak || Spacewatch || — || align=right | 3.1 km || 
|-id=719 bgcolor=#E9E9E9
| 218719 ||  || — || October 24, 2005 || Kitt Peak || Spacewatch || — || align=right | 2.7 km || 
|-id=720 bgcolor=#E9E9E9
| 218720 ||  || — || October 24, 2005 || Kitt Peak || Spacewatch || — || align=right | 2.1 km || 
|-id=721 bgcolor=#E9E9E9
| 218721 ||  || — || October 24, 2005 || Kitt Peak || Spacewatch || — || align=right | 2.9 km || 
|-id=722 bgcolor=#E9E9E9
| 218722 ||  || — || October 24, 2005 || Palomar || NEAT || — || align=right | 3.6 km || 
|-id=723 bgcolor=#E9E9E9
| 218723 ||  || — || October 25, 2005 || Mount Lemmon || Mount Lemmon Survey || — || align=right | 2.5 km || 
|-id=724 bgcolor=#d6d6d6
| 218724 ||  || — || October 22, 2005 || Palomar || CSS || — || align=right | 3.1 km || 
|-id=725 bgcolor=#E9E9E9
| 218725 ||  || — || October 24, 2005 || Kitt Peak || Spacewatch || — || align=right | 2.7 km || 
|-id=726 bgcolor=#E9E9E9
| 218726 ||  || — || October 25, 2005 || Mount Lemmon || Mount Lemmon Survey || — || align=right | 1.8 km || 
|-id=727 bgcolor=#E9E9E9
| 218727 ||  || — || October 27, 2005 || Kitt Peak || Spacewatch || — || align=right | 2.2 km || 
|-id=728 bgcolor=#E9E9E9
| 218728 ||  || — || October 23, 2005 || Palomar || NEAT || WIT || align=right | 1.5 km || 
|-id=729 bgcolor=#E9E9E9
| 218729 ||  || — || October 23, 2005 || Palomar || CSS || GEF || align=right | 2.3 km || 
|-id=730 bgcolor=#E9E9E9
| 218730 ||  || — || October 24, 2005 || Kitt Peak || Spacewatch || — || align=right | 1.9 km || 
|-id=731 bgcolor=#E9E9E9
| 218731 ||  || — || October 25, 2005 || Kitt Peak || Spacewatch || PAD || align=right | 2.1 km || 
|-id=732 bgcolor=#E9E9E9
| 218732 ||  || — || October 29, 2005 || Kitt Peak || Spacewatch || HEN || align=right | 1.7 km || 
|-id=733 bgcolor=#E9E9E9
| 218733 ||  || — || October 31, 2005 || Catalina || CSS || JUN || align=right | 1.7 km || 
|-id=734 bgcolor=#E9E9E9
| 218734 ||  || — || October 27, 2005 || Kitt Peak || Spacewatch || HEN || align=right | 1.4 km || 
|-id=735 bgcolor=#E9E9E9
| 218735 ||  || — || October 27, 2005 || Kitt Peak || Spacewatch || WIT || align=right | 1.4 km || 
|-id=736 bgcolor=#d6d6d6
| 218736 ||  || — || October 31, 2005 || Mount Lemmon || Mount Lemmon Survey || KOR || align=right | 1.5 km || 
|-id=737 bgcolor=#E9E9E9
| 218737 ||  || — || October 31, 2005 || Kitt Peak || Spacewatch || — || align=right | 2.4 km || 
|-id=738 bgcolor=#E9E9E9
| 218738 ||  || — || October 29, 2005 || Socorro || LINEAR || — || align=right | 2.8 km || 
|-id=739 bgcolor=#d6d6d6
| 218739 ||  || — || October 30, 2005 || Socorro || LINEAR || — || align=right | 4.9 km || 
|-id=740 bgcolor=#E9E9E9
| 218740 ||  || — || October 30, 2005 || Socorro || LINEAR || — || align=right | 1.7 km || 
|-id=741 bgcolor=#E9E9E9
| 218741 ||  || — || October 31, 2005 || Palomar || NEAT || ADE || align=right | 3.3 km || 
|-id=742 bgcolor=#E9E9E9
| 218742 ||  || — || October 30, 2005 || Mount Lemmon || Mount Lemmon Survey || AGN || align=right | 1.8 km || 
|-id=743 bgcolor=#E9E9E9
| 218743 ||  || — || October 25, 2005 || Catalina || CSS || BAR || align=right | 2.4 km || 
|-id=744 bgcolor=#E9E9E9
| 218744 ||  || — || October 25, 2005 || Socorro || LINEAR || MAR || align=right | 1.7 km || 
|-id=745 bgcolor=#E9E9E9
| 218745 ||  || — || October 22, 2005 || Palomar || NEAT || EUN || align=right | 1.3 km || 
|-id=746 bgcolor=#E9E9E9
| 218746 ||  || — || October 22, 2005 || Catalina || CSS || AGN || align=right | 1.7 km || 
|-id=747 bgcolor=#E9E9E9
| 218747 ||  || — || October 23, 2005 || Palomar || NEAT || — || align=right | 2.9 km || 
|-id=748 bgcolor=#E9E9E9
| 218748 ||  || — || October 23, 2005 || Catalina || CSS || — || align=right | 3.0 km || 
|-id=749 bgcolor=#E9E9E9
| 218749 ||  || — || October 27, 2005 || Catalina || CSS || — || align=right | 2.1 km || 
|-id=750 bgcolor=#E9E9E9
| 218750 ||  || — || October 31, 2005 || Catalina || CSS || — || align=right | 2.4 km || 
|-id=751 bgcolor=#E9E9E9
| 218751 ||  || — || October 23, 2005 || Catalina || CSS || — || align=right | 2.7 km || 
|-id=752 bgcolor=#E9E9E9
| 218752 Tentlingen ||  ||  || November 7, 2005 || Marly || Naef Obs. || — || align=right | 2.1 km || 
|-id=753 bgcolor=#E9E9E9
| 218753 ||  || — || November 1, 2005 || Kitt Peak || Spacewatch || — || align=right | 2.4 km || 
|-id=754 bgcolor=#d6d6d6
| 218754 ||  || — || November 4, 2005 || Kitt Peak || Spacewatch || TIR || align=right | 5.8 km || 
|-id=755 bgcolor=#E9E9E9
| 218755 ||  || — || November 3, 2005 || Catalina || CSS || — || align=right | 2.4 km || 
|-id=756 bgcolor=#E9E9E9
| 218756 ||  || — || November 5, 2005 || Anderson Mesa || LONEOS || — || align=right | 1.6 km || 
|-id=757 bgcolor=#d6d6d6
| 218757 ||  || — || November 6, 2005 || Kitt Peak || Spacewatch || — || align=right | 3.4 km || 
|-id=758 bgcolor=#E9E9E9
| 218758 ||  || — || November 5, 2005 || Kitt Peak || Spacewatch || — || align=right | 3.1 km || 
|-id=759 bgcolor=#E9E9E9
| 218759 ||  || — || November 10, 2005 || Catalina || CSS || — || align=right | 3.9 km || 
|-id=760 bgcolor=#E9E9E9
| 218760 ||  || — || November 6, 2005 || Mount Lemmon || Mount Lemmon Survey || — || align=right | 3.2 km || 
|-id=761 bgcolor=#d6d6d6
| 218761 ||  || — || November 3, 2005 || Kitt Peak || Spacewatch || — || align=right | 4.3 km || 
|-id=762 bgcolor=#E9E9E9
| 218762 ||  || — || November 11, 2005 || Socorro || LINEAR || — || align=right | 1.9 km || 
|-id=763 bgcolor=#E9E9E9
| 218763 ||  || — || November 11, 2005 || Socorro || LINEAR || — || align=right | 3.3 km || 
|-id=764 bgcolor=#E9E9E9
| 218764 ||  || — || November 21, 2005 || Socorro || LINEAR || GAL || align=right | 2.9 km || 
|-id=765 bgcolor=#E9E9E9
| 218765 ||  || — || November 20, 2005 || Catalina || CSS || MAR || align=right | 2.3 km || 
|-id=766 bgcolor=#E9E9E9
| 218766 ||  || — || November 22, 2005 || Kitt Peak || Spacewatch || — || align=right | 2.3 km || 
|-id=767 bgcolor=#d6d6d6
| 218767 ||  || — || November 22, 2005 || Kitt Peak || Spacewatch || — || align=right | 5.1 km || 
|-id=768 bgcolor=#E9E9E9
| 218768 ||  || — || November 25, 2005 || Catalina || CSS || — || align=right | 3.4 km || 
|-id=769 bgcolor=#E9E9E9
| 218769 ||  || — || November 25, 2005 || Mount Lemmon || Mount Lemmon Survey || AST || align=right | 2.1 km || 
|-id=770 bgcolor=#E9E9E9
| 218770 ||  || — || November 28, 2005 || Kitt Peak || Spacewatch || — || align=right | 2.8 km || 
|-id=771 bgcolor=#E9E9E9
| 218771 ||  || — || November 28, 2005 || Socorro || LINEAR || — || align=right | 2.5 km || 
|-id=772 bgcolor=#E9E9E9
| 218772 ||  || — || November 30, 2005 || Kitt Peak || Spacewatch || — || align=right | 2.6 km || 
|-id=773 bgcolor=#E9E9E9
| 218773 ||  || — || November 26, 2005 || Catalina || CSS || WIT || align=right | 1.5 km || 
|-id=774 bgcolor=#d6d6d6
| 218774 ||  || — || November 28, 2005 || Kitt Peak || Spacewatch || — || align=right | 5.5 km || 
|-id=775 bgcolor=#d6d6d6
| 218775 ||  || — || November 28, 2005 || Mount Lemmon || Mount Lemmon Survey || — || align=right | 4.5 km || 
|-id=776 bgcolor=#d6d6d6
| 218776 ||  || — || November 29, 2005 || Catalina || CSS || — || align=right | 3.4 km || 
|-id=777 bgcolor=#E9E9E9
| 218777 ||  || — || December 1, 2005 || Socorro || LINEAR || AGN || align=right | 1.9 km || 
|-id=778 bgcolor=#d6d6d6
| 218778 ||  || — || December 1, 2005 || Mount Lemmon || Mount Lemmon Survey || — || align=right | 3.0 km || 
|-id=779 bgcolor=#d6d6d6
| 218779 ||  || — || December 4, 2005 || Kitt Peak || Spacewatch || KOR || align=right | 1.7 km || 
|-id=780 bgcolor=#d6d6d6
| 218780 ||  || — || December 2, 2005 || Socorro || LINEAR || — || align=right | 6.2 km || 
|-id=781 bgcolor=#d6d6d6
| 218781 ||  || — || December 4, 2005 || Kitt Peak || Spacewatch || KOR || align=right | 2.4 km || 
|-id=782 bgcolor=#d6d6d6
| 218782 ||  || — || December 2, 2005 || Kitt Peak || Spacewatch || — || align=right | 3.5 km || 
|-id=783 bgcolor=#d6d6d6
| 218783 ||  || — || December 10, 2005 || Kitt Peak || Spacewatch || — || align=right | 5.1 km || 
|-id=784 bgcolor=#E9E9E9
| 218784 ||  || — || December 21, 2005 || Catalina || CSS || — || align=right | 4.3 km || 
|-id=785 bgcolor=#d6d6d6
| 218785 ||  || — || December 22, 2005 || Kitt Peak || Spacewatch || — || align=right | 3.9 km || 
|-id=786 bgcolor=#d6d6d6
| 218786 ||  || — || December 24, 2005 || Kitt Peak || Spacewatch || KOR || align=right | 1.8 km || 
|-id=787 bgcolor=#d6d6d6
| 218787 ||  || — || December 24, 2005 || Kitt Peak || Spacewatch || — || align=right | 6.9 km || 
|-id=788 bgcolor=#fefefe
| 218788 ||  || — || December 29, 2005 || Socorro || LINEAR || — || align=right | 1.4 km || 
|-id=789 bgcolor=#d6d6d6
| 218789 ||  || — || December 27, 2005 || Kitt Peak || Spacewatch || — || align=right | 5.2 km || 
|-id=790 bgcolor=#d6d6d6
| 218790 ||  || — || December 22, 2005 || Kitt Peak || CSS || ALA || align=right | 5.8 km || 
|-id=791 bgcolor=#d6d6d6
| 218791 ||  || — || December 27, 2005 || Kitt Peak || Spacewatch || 7:4 || align=right | 5.9 km || 
|-id=792 bgcolor=#d6d6d6
| 218792 ||  || — || December 29, 2005 || Kitt Peak || Spacewatch || — || align=right | 3.6 km || 
|-id=793 bgcolor=#d6d6d6
| 218793 ||  || — || January 2, 2006 || Catalina || CSS || — || align=right | 4.1 km || 
|-id=794 bgcolor=#fefefe
| 218794 ||  || — || January 5, 2006 || Anderson Mesa || LONEOS || — || align=right | 1.6 km || 
|-id=795 bgcolor=#d6d6d6
| 218795 ||  || — || January 5, 2006 || Anderson Mesa || LONEOS || — || align=right | 4.5 km || 
|-id=796 bgcolor=#d6d6d6
| 218796 ||  || — || January 3, 2006 || Socorro || LINEAR || — || align=right | 4.3 km || 
|-id=797 bgcolor=#d6d6d6
| 218797 ||  || — || January 6, 2006 || Mount Lemmon || Mount Lemmon Survey || — || align=right | 3.4 km || 
|-id=798 bgcolor=#d6d6d6
| 218798 ||  || — || January 8, 2006 || Mount Lemmon || Mount Lemmon Survey || — || align=right | 4.3 km || 
|-id=799 bgcolor=#d6d6d6
| 218799 ||  || — || January 20, 2006 || Kitt Peak || Spacewatch || — || align=right | 4.6 km || 
|-id=800 bgcolor=#d6d6d6
| 218800 ||  || — || January 23, 2006 || Kitt Peak || Spacewatch || — || align=right | 5.6 km || 
|}

218801–218900 

|-bgcolor=#d6d6d6
| 218801 ||  || — || January 28, 2006 || Mount Lemmon || Mount Lemmon Survey || — || align=right | 4.2 km || 
|-id=802 bgcolor=#d6d6d6
| 218802 ||  || — || January 21, 2006 || Mount Lemmon || Mount Lemmon Survey || — || align=right | 3.6 km || 
|-id=803 bgcolor=#d6d6d6
| 218803 ||  || — || January 24, 2006 || Anderson Mesa || LONEOS || CRO || align=right | 5.1 km || 
|-id=804 bgcolor=#C2FFFF
| 218804 ||  || — || January 31, 2006 || Kitt Peak || Spacewatch || L5 || align=right | 9.9 km || 
|-id=805 bgcolor=#d6d6d6
| 218805 ||  || — || February 2, 2006 || Mount Lemmon || Mount Lemmon Survey || — || align=right | 4.0 km || 
|-id=806 bgcolor=#d6d6d6
| 218806 ||  || — || February 21, 2006 || Calvin-Rehoboth || L. A. Molnar || — || align=right | 4.1 km || 
|-id=807 bgcolor=#d6d6d6
| 218807 ||  || — || February 20, 2006 || Catalina || CSS || HYG || align=right | 4.0 km || 
|-id=808 bgcolor=#d6d6d6
| 218808 ||  || — || February 24, 2006 || Mount Lemmon || Mount Lemmon Survey || HYG || align=right | 4.5 km || 
|-id=809 bgcolor=#E9E9E9
| 218809 ||  || — || April 7, 2006 || Mount Lemmon || Mount Lemmon Survey || — || align=right | 4.3 km || 
|-id=810 bgcolor=#E9E9E9
| 218810 ||  || — || April 2, 2006 || Anderson Mesa || LONEOS || ADE || align=right | 2.0 km || 
|-id=811 bgcolor=#fefefe
| 218811 ||  || — || August 12, 2006 || Palomar || NEAT || — || align=right data-sort-value="0.80" | 800 m || 
|-id=812 bgcolor=#fefefe
| 218812 ||  || — || September 15, 2006 || Kitt Peak || Spacewatch || FLO || align=right data-sort-value="0.67" | 670 m || 
|-id=813 bgcolor=#FA8072
| 218813 ||  || — || September 17, 2006 || Catalina || CSS || — || align=right data-sort-value="0.91" | 910 m || 
|-id=814 bgcolor=#fefefe
| 218814 ||  || — || September 17, 2006 || Catalina || CSS || FLO || align=right data-sort-value="0.85" | 850 m || 
|-id=815 bgcolor=#d6d6d6
| 218815 ||  || — || September 17, 2006 || Anderson Mesa || LONEOS || — || align=right | 4.5 km || 
|-id=816 bgcolor=#fefefe
| 218816 ||  || — || September 24, 2006 || Kitt Peak || Spacewatch || — || align=right data-sort-value="0.85" | 850 m || 
|-id=817 bgcolor=#d6d6d6
| 218817 ||  || — || September 25, 2006 || Mount Lemmon || Mount Lemmon Survey || — || align=right | 3.3 km || 
|-id=818 bgcolor=#FA8072
| 218818 ||  || — || September 26, 2006 || Mount Lemmon || Mount Lemmon Survey || — || align=right data-sort-value="0.99" | 990 m || 
|-id=819 bgcolor=#fefefe
| 218819 ||  || — || September 26, 2006 || Kitt Peak || Spacewatch || — || align=right | 1.1 km || 
|-id=820 bgcolor=#fefefe
| 218820 ||  || — || September 29, 2006 || Kitt Peak || Spacewatch || — || align=right | 1.3 km || 
|-id=821 bgcolor=#fefefe
| 218821 ||  || — || October 2, 2006 || Mount Lemmon || Mount Lemmon Survey || FLO || align=right data-sort-value="0.82" | 820 m || 
|-id=822 bgcolor=#fefefe
| 218822 ||  || — || October 11, 2006 || Kitt Peak || Spacewatch || — || align=right data-sort-value="0.81" | 810 m || 
|-id=823 bgcolor=#fefefe
| 218823 ||  || — || October 11, 2006 || Kitt Peak || Spacewatch || — || align=right data-sort-value="0.92" | 920 m || 
|-id=824 bgcolor=#fefefe
| 218824 ||  || — || October 12, 2006 || Kitt Peak || Spacewatch || — || align=right data-sort-value="0.91" | 910 m || 
|-id=825 bgcolor=#fefefe
| 218825 ||  || — || October 12, 2006 || Kitt Peak || Spacewatch || FLO || align=right data-sort-value="0.78" | 780 m || 
|-id=826 bgcolor=#fefefe
| 218826 ||  || — || October 12, 2006 || Kitt Peak || Spacewatch || — || align=right data-sort-value="0.89" | 890 m || 
|-id=827 bgcolor=#fefefe
| 218827 ||  || — || October 11, 2006 || Palomar || NEAT || V || align=right | 1.00 km || 
|-id=828 bgcolor=#fefefe
| 218828 ||  || — || October 12, 2006 || Kitt Peak || Spacewatch || V || align=right data-sort-value="0.95" | 950 m || 
|-id=829 bgcolor=#fefefe
| 218829 ||  || — || October 12, 2006 || Palomar || NEAT || — || align=right | 1.2 km || 
|-id=830 bgcolor=#fefefe
| 218830 ||  || — || October 13, 2006 || Kitt Peak || Spacewatch || — || align=right | 1.1 km || 
|-id=831 bgcolor=#fefefe
| 218831 ||  || — || October 15, 2006 || Kitt Peak || Spacewatch || — || align=right data-sort-value="0.82" | 820 m || 
|-id=832 bgcolor=#fefefe
| 218832 ||  || — || October 12, 2006 || Palomar || NEAT || FLO || align=right data-sort-value="0.90" | 900 m || 
|-id=833 bgcolor=#fefefe
| 218833 ||  || — || October 16, 2006 || Catalina || CSS || — || align=right data-sort-value="0.95" | 950 m || 
|-id=834 bgcolor=#fefefe
| 218834 ||  || — || October 16, 2006 || Kitt Peak || Spacewatch || NYS || align=right | 1.3 km || 
|-id=835 bgcolor=#fefefe
| 218835 ||  || — || October 16, 2006 || Kitt Peak || Spacewatch || — || align=right data-sort-value="0.91" | 910 m || 
|-id=836 bgcolor=#E9E9E9
| 218836 ||  || — || October 16, 2006 || Kitt Peak || Spacewatch || — || align=right | 3.2 km || 
|-id=837 bgcolor=#fefefe
| 218837 ||  || — || October 17, 2006 || Kitt Peak || Spacewatch || FLO || align=right data-sort-value="0.80" | 800 m || 
|-id=838 bgcolor=#fefefe
| 218838 ||  || — || October 23, 2006 || Kitami || K. Endate || FLO || align=right data-sort-value="0.83" | 830 m || 
|-id=839 bgcolor=#fefefe
| 218839 ||  || — || October 16, 2006 || Catalina || CSS || FLO || align=right data-sort-value="0.89" | 890 m || 
|-id=840 bgcolor=#fefefe
| 218840 ||  || — || October 17, 2006 || Catalina || CSS || FLO || align=right data-sort-value="0.87" | 870 m || 
|-id=841 bgcolor=#fefefe
| 218841 ||  || — || October 17, 2006 || Mount Lemmon || Mount Lemmon Survey || NYS || align=right | 1.1 km || 
|-id=842 bgcolor=#fefefe
| 218842 ||  || — || October 16, 2006 || Catalina || CSS || FLO || align=right data-sort-value="0.95" | 950 m || 
|-id=843 bgcolor=#fefefe
| 218843 ||  || — || October 22, 2006 || Palomar || NEAT || — || align=right data-sort-value="0.98" | 980 m || 
|-id=844 bgcolor=#fefefe
| 218844 ||  || — || October 22, 2006 || Palomar || NEAT || FLO || align=right | 1.0 km || 
|-id=845 bgcolor=#fefefe
| 218845 ||  || — || October 23, 2006 || Kitt Peak || Spacewatch || — || align=right | 1.0 km || 
|-id=846 bgcolor=#fefefe
| 218846 ||  || — || October 20, 2006 || Palomar || NEAT || — || align=right data-sort-value="0.96" | 960 m || 
|-id=847 bgcolor=#E9E9E9
| 218847 ||  || — || October 23, 2006 || Mount Lemmon || Mount Lemmon Survey || — || align=right | 4.5 km || 
|-id=848 bgcolor=#fefefe
| 218848 ||  || — || October 31, 2006 || Mount Lemmon || Mount Lemmon Survey || — || align=right | 1.3 km || 
|-id=849 bgcolor=#fefefe
| 218849 ||  || — || October 28, 2006 || Mount Lemmon || Mount Lemmon Survey || — || align=right | 1.2 km || 
|-id=850 bgcolor=#fefefe
| 218850 ||  || — || November 14, 2006 || Catalina || CSS || FLO || align=right data-sort-value="0.93" | 930 m || 
|-id=851 bgcolor=#fefefe
| 218851 ||  || — || November 11, 2006 || Catalina || CSS || — || align=right | 1.0 km || 
|-id=852 bgcolor=#fefefe
| 218852 ||  || — || November 12, 2006 || Mount Lemmon || Mount Lemmon Survey || — || align=right | 1.3 km || 
|-id=853 bgcolor=#fefefe
| 218853 ||  || — || November 10, 2006 || Kitt Peak || Spacewatch || — || align=right | 1.2 km || 
|-id=854 bgcolor=#fefefe
| 218854 ||  || — || November 14, 2006 || Mount Lemmon || Mount Lemmon Survey || — || align=right | 1.0 km || 
|-id=855 bgcolor=#fefefe
| 218855 ||  || — || November 15, 2006 || Catalina || CSS || — || align=right | 1.1 km || 
|-id=856 bgcolor=#fefefe
| 218856 ||  || — || November 13, 2006 || Kitt Peak || Spacewatch || — || align=right data-sort-value="0.82" | 820 m || 
|-id=857 bgcolor=#fefefe
| 218857 ||  || — || November 18, 2006 || Kitt Peak || Spacewatch || — || align=right data-sort-value="0.93" | 930 m || 
|-id=858 bgcolor=#fefefe
| 218858 ||  || — || November 18, 2006 || Kitt Peak || Spacewatch || NYS || align=right data-sort-value="0.87" | 870 m || 
|-id=859 bgcolor=#fefefe
| 218859 ||  || — || November 18, 2006 || Kitt Peak || Spacewatch || — || align=right | 1.4 km || 
|-id=860 bgcolor=#fefefe
| 218860 ||  || — || November 19, 2006 || Catalina || CSS || FLO || align=right data-sort-value="0.79" | 790 m || 
|-id=861 bgcolor=#fefefe
| 218861 ||  || — || November 19, 2006 || Kitt Peak || Spacewatch || — || align=right | 1.0 km || 
|-id=862 bgcolor=#fefefe
| 218862 ||  || — || November 21, 2006 || Mount Lemmon || Mount Lemmon Survey || — || align=right | 1.3 km || 
|-id=863 bgcolor=#FFC2E0
| 218863 ||  || — || November 23, 2006 || Catalina || CSS || APO +1km || align=right | 1.2 km || 
|-id=864 bgcolor=#E9E9E9
| 218864 ||  || — || November 23, 2006 || Kitt Peak || Spacewatch || — || align=right | 1.2 km || 
|-id=865 bgcolor=#fefefe
| 218865 ||  || — || November 17, 2006 || Kitt Peak || Spacewatch || — || align=right | 1.6 km || 
|-id=866 bgcolor=#E9E9E9
| 218866 Alexantioch ||  ||  || December 15, 2006 || Vallemare di Borbona || V. S. Casulli || — || align=right | 3.0 km || 
|-id=867 bgcolor=#fefefe
| 218867 ||  || — || December 11, 2006 || Kitt Peak || Spacewatch || — || align=right | 1.1 km || 
|-id=868 bgcolor=#E9E9E9
| 218868 ||  || — || December 12, 2006 || Marly || P. Kocher || — || align=right | 3.8 km || 
|-id=869 bgcolor=#fefefe
| 218869 ||  || — || December 14, 2006 || Catalina || CSS || — || align=right | 1.1 km || 
|-id=870 bgcolor=#fefefe
| 218870 ||  || — || December 15, 2006 || Mount Lemmon || Mount Lemmon Survey || — || align=right | 1.4 km || 
|-id=871 bgcolor=#E9E9E9
| 218871 ||  || — || December 16, 2006 || Kitt Peak || Spacewatch || — || align=right | 1.7 km || 
|-id=872 bgcolor=#E9E9E9
| 218872 ||  || — || December 16, 2006 || Kitt Peak || Spacewatch || — || align=right | 2.0 km || 
|-id=873 bgcolor=#E9E9E9
| 218873 ||  || — || December 21, 2006 || Kitt Peak || Spacewatch || MAR || align=right | 1.9 km || 
|-id=874 bgcolor=#fefefe
| 218874 ||  || — || December 21, 2006 || Kitt Peak || Spacewatch || — || align=right | 1.3 km || 
|-id=875 bgcolor=#E9E9E9
| 218875 ||  || — || December 21, 2006 || Kitt Peak || Spacewatch || — || align=right | 2.8 km || 
|-id=876 bgcolor=#fefefe
| 218876 ||  || — || January 10, 2007 || Nyukasa || Mount Nyukasa Stn. || NYS || align=right data-sort-value="0.91" | 910 m || 
|-id=877 bgcolor=#fefefe
| 218877 ||  || — || January 10, 2007 || Mount Lemmon || Mount Lemmon Survey || — || align=right | 1.2 km || 
|-id=878 bgcolor=#fefefe
| 218878 ||  || — || January 16, 2007 || Catalina || CSS || — || align=right | 1.2 km || 
|-id=879 bgcolor=#fefefe
| 218879 ||  || — || January 17, 2007 || Palomar || NEAT || V || align=right | 1.2 km || 
|-id=880 bgcolor=#E9E9E9
| 218880 ||  || — || January 24, 2007 || Socorro || LINEAR || EUN || align=right | 2.0 km || 
|-id=881 bgcolor=#fefefe
| 218881 ||  || — || January 24, 2007 || Socorro || LINEAR || — || align=right | 1.3 km || 
|-id=882 bgcolor=#E9E9E9
| 218882 ||  || — || January 24, 2007 || Catalina || CSS || WIT || align=right | 1.5 km || 
|-id=883 bgcolor=#E9E9E9
| 218883 ||  || — || January 17, 2007 || Palomar || NEAT || — || align=right | 1.4 km || 
|-id=884 bgcolor=#E9E9E9
| 218884 ||  || — || February 6, 2007 || Kitt Peak || Spacewatch || MAR || align=right | 1.7 km || 
|-id=885 bgcolor=#fefefe
| 218885 ||  || — || February 6, 2007 || Mount Lemmon || Mount Lemmon Survey || NYS || align=right data-sort-value="0.99" | 990 m || 
|-id=886 bgcolor=#E9E9E9
| 218886 ||  || — || February 6, 2007 || Palomar || NEAT || — || align=right | 1.3 km || 
|-id=887 bgcolor=#E9E9E9
| 218887 ||  || — || February 6, 2007 || Mount Lemmon || Mount Lemmon Survey || — || align=right | 3.4 km || 
|-id=888 bgcolor=#d6d6d6
| 218888 ||  || — || February 7, 2007 || Kitt Peak || Spacewatch || — || align=right | 3.6 km || 
|-id=889 bgcolor=#d6d6d6
| 218889 ||  || — || February 7, 2007 || Kitt Peak || Spacewatch || — || align=right | 5.6 km || 
|-id=890 bgcolor=#d6d6d6
| 218890 ||  || — || February 15, 2007 || Palomar || NEAT || — || align=right | 4.4 km || 
|-id=891 bgcolor=#fefefe
| 218891 ||  || — || February 16, 2007 || Catalina || CSS || V || align=right | 1.1 km || 
|-id=892 bgcolor=#d6d6d6
| 218892 ||  || — || February 17, 2007 || Kitt Peak || Spacewatch || — || align=right | 4.1 km || 
|-id=893 bgcolor=#d6d6d6
| 218893 ||  || — || February 17, 2007 || Kitt Peak || Spacewatch || — || align=right | 3.9 km || 
|-id=894 bgcolor=#fefefe
| 218894 ||  || — || February 22, 2007 || Anderson Mesa || LONEOS || NYS || align=right data-sort-value="0.84" | 840 m || 
|-id=895 bgcolor=#d6d6d6
| 218895 ||  || — || February 21, 2007 || Kitt Peak || Spacewatch || — || align=right | 4.8 km || 
|-id=896 bgcolor=#E9E9E9
| 218896 ||  || — || February 21, 2007 || Kitt Peak || Spacewatch || — || align=right | 3.8 km || 
|-id=897 bgcolor=#E9E9E9
| 218897 ||  || — || February 23, 2007 || Socorro || LINEAR || — || align=right | 2.9 km || 
|-id=898 bgcolor=#fefefe
| 218898 ||  || — || February 25, 2007 || Catalina || CSS || H || align=right data-sort-value="0.92" | 920 m || 
|-id=899 bgcolor=#d6d6d6
| 218899 ||  || — || March 9, 2007 || Kitt Peak || Spacewatch || — || align=right | 3.0 km || 
|-id=900 bgcolor=#E9E9E9
| 218900 Gabybuchholz ||  ||  || March 8, 2007 || Wildberg || R. Apitzsch || — || align=right | 2.1 km || 
|}

218901–219000 

|-bgcolor=#d6d6d6
| 218901 Gerdbuchholz ||  ||  || March 10, 2007 || Wildberg || R. Apitzsch || — || align=right | 3.6 km || 
|-id=902 bgcolor=#d6d6d6
| 218902 ||  || — || March 9, 2007 || Catalina || CSS || URS || align=right | 5.2 km || 
|-id=903 bgcolor=#d6d6d6
| 218903 ||  || — || March 9, 2007 || Palomar || NEAT || MEL || align=right | 6.6 km || 
|-id=904 bgcolor=#d6d6d6
| 218904 ||  || — || March 11, 2007 || Mount Lemmon || Mount Lemmon Survey || EOS || align=right | 3.8 km || 
|-id=905 bgcolor=#E9E9E9
| 218905 ||  || — || March 11, 2007 || Catalina || CSS || — || align=right | 2.9 km || 
|-id=906 bgcolor=#E9E9E9
| 218906 ||  || — || March 14, 2007 || Kitt Peak || Spacewatch || — || align=right | 2.9 km || 
|-id=907 bgcolor=#fefefe
| 218907 ||  || — || March 9, 2007 || Mount Lemmon || Mount Lemmon Survey || NYS || align=right data-sort-value="0.86" | 860 m || 
|-id=908 bgcolor=#d6d6d6
| 218908 ||  || — || March 15, 2007 || Mount Lemmon || Mount Lemmon Survey || — || align=right | 3.2 km || 
|-id=909 bgcolor=#d6d6d6
| 218909 ||  || — || March 10, 2007 || Mount Lemmon || Mount Lemmon Survey || — || align=right | 3.5 km || 
|-id=910 bgcolor=#d6d6d6
| 218910 ||  || — || March 11, 2007 || Mount Lemmon || Mount Lemmon Survey || — || align=right | 2.7 km || 
|-id=911 bgcolor=#d6d6d6
| 218911 ||  || — || March 20, 2007 || Mount Lemmon || Mount Lemmon Survey || — || align=right | 3.6 km || 
|-id=912 bgcolor=#fefefe
| 218912 ||  || — || April 14, 2007 || Mount Lemmon || Mount Lemmon Survey || — || align=right | 1.4 km || 
|-id=913 bgcolor=#E9E9E9
| 218913 ||  || — || April 20, 2007 || Kitt Peak || Spacewatch || — || align=right | 1.9 km || 
|-id=914 bgcolor=#E9E9E9
| 218914 Tangauchin ||  ||  || May 19, 2007 || XuYi || PMO NEO || — || align=right | 3.2 km || 
|-id=915 bgcolor=#fefefe
| 218915 ||  || — || August 13, 2007 || La Sagra || OAM Obs. || — || align=right | 1.3 km || 
|-id=916 bgcolor=#fefefe
| 218916 ||  || — || September 27, 2007 || Mount Lemmon || Mount Lemmon Survey || H || align=right | 1.1 km || 
|-id=917 bgcolor=#E9E9E9
| 218917 ||  || — || October 11, 2007 || La Sagra || OAM Obs. || — || align=right | 5.8 km || 
|-id=918 bgcolor=#d6d6d6
| 218918 ||  || — || October 9, 2007 || Catalina || CSS || — || align=right | 4.7 km || 
|-id=919 bgcolor=#E9E9E9
| 218919 ||  || — || October 7, 2007 || Kitt Peak || Spacewatch || EUN || align=right | 3.4 km || 
|-id=920 bgcolor=#d6d6d6
| 218920 ||  || — || October 14, 2007 || Socorro || LINEAR || — || align=right | 3.9 km || 
|-id=921 bgcolor=#E9E9E9
| 218921 ||  || — || October 13, 2007 || Anderson Mesa || LONEOS || MAR || align=right | 1.9 km || 
|-id=922 bgcolor=#d6d6d6
| 218922 ||  || — || October 14, 2007 || Mount Lemmon || Mount Lemmon Survey || — || align=right | 3.5 km || 
|-id=923 bgcolor=#d6d6d6
| 218923 ||  || — || October 16, 2007 || Bisei SG Center || BATTeRS || — || align=right | 5.7 km || 
|-id=924 bgcolor=#E9E9E9
| 218924 ||  || — || October 30, 2007 || Kitt Peak || Spacewatch || HEN || align=right | 1.4 km || 
|-id=925 bgcolor=#d6d6d6
| 218925 ||  || — || November 3, 2007 || Socorro || LINEAR || EOS || align=right | 2.6 km || 
|-id=926 bgcolor=#E9E9E9
| 218926 ||  || — || November 12, 2007 || Catalina || CSS || — || align=right | 1.5 km || 
|-id=927 bgcolor=#d6d6d6
| 218927 ||  || — || December 16, 2007 || Kitt Peak || Spacewatch || KOR || align=right | 2.1 km || 
|-id=928 bgcolor=#fefefe
| 218928 ||  || — || January 15, 2008 || Mount Lemmon || Mount Lemmon Survey || — || align=right | 1.1 km || 
|-id=929 bgcolor=#fefefe
| 218929 ||  || — || January 28, 2008 || Lulin Observatory || LUSS || — || align=right | 1.5 km || 
|-id=930 bgcolor=#fefefe
| 218930 ||  || — || January 30, 2008 || Mount Lemmon || Mount Lemmon Survey || — || align=right data-sort-value="0.88" | 880 m || 
|-id=931 bgcolor=#fefefe
| 218931 ||  || — || January 30, 2008 || Catalina || CSS || NYS || align=right data-sort-value="0.82" | 820 m || 
|-id=932 bgcolor=#fefefe
| 218932 ||  || — || February 1, 2008 || La Sagra || OAM Obs. || — || align=right | 1.8 km || 
|-id=933 bgcolor=#fefefe
| 218933 ||  || — || February 3, 2008 || Kitt Peak || Spacewatch || MAS || align=right data-sort-value="0.99" | 990 m || 
|-id=934 bgcolor=#fefefe
| 218934 ||  || — || February 1, 2008 || Kitt Peak || Spacewatch || FLO || align=right data-sort-value="0.74" | 740 m || 
|-id=935 bgcolor=#fefefe
| 218935 ||  || — || February 8, 2008 || Mount Lemmon || Mount Lemmon Survey || MAS || align=right | 1.1 km || 
|-id=936 bgcolor=#fefefe
| 218936 ||  || — || February 6, 2008 || Catalina || CSS || — || align=right | 1.5 km || 
|-id=937 bgcolor=#E9E9E9
| 218937 ||  || — || February 14, 2008 || Grove Creek || F. Tozzi || — || align=right | 2.9 km || 
|-id=938 bgcolor=#E9E9E9
| 218938 ||  || — || February 8, 2008 || Kitt Peak || Spacewatch || — || align=right | 1.9 km || 
|-id=939 bgcolor=#E9E9E9
| 218939 ||  || — || February 8, 2008 || Kitt Peak || Spacewatch || DOR || align=right | 3.8 km || 
|-id=940 bgcolor=#fefefe
| 218940 ||  || — || February 9, 2008 || Kitt Peak || Spacewatch || NYS || align=right data-sort-value="0.94" | 940 m || 
|-id=941 bgcolor=#fefefe
| 218941 ||  || — || February 10, 2008 || Mount Lemmon || Mount Lemmon Survey || FLO || align=right data-sort-value="0.80" | 800 m || 
|-id=942 bgcolor=#fefefe
| 218942 ||  || — || February 10, 2008 || Kitt Peak || Spacewatch || — || align=right | 1.4 km || 
|-id=943 bgcolor=#fefefe
| 218943 ||  || — || February 26, 2008 || Mount Lemmon || Mount Lemmon Survey || — || align=right data-sort-value="0.91" | 910 m || 
|-id=944 bgcolor=#fefefe
| 218944 ||  || — || February 28, 2008 || Mount Lemmon || Mount Lemmon Survey || NYS || align=right | 1.0 km || 
|-id=945 bgcolor=#fefefe
| 218945 ||  || — || February 26, 2008 || Mount Lemmon || Mount Lemmon Survey || — || align=right | 1.4 km || 
|-id=946 bgcolor=#fefefe
| 218946 ||  || — || February 26, 2008 || Mount Lemmon || Mount Lemmon Survey || NYS || align=right | 1.0 km || 
|-id=947 bgcolor=#fefefe
| 218947 ||  || — || February 27, 2008 || Catalina || CSS || PHO || align=right | 1.7 km || 
|-id=948 bgcolor=#E9E9E9
| 218948 ||  || — || February 27, 2008 || Mount Lemmon || Mount Lemmon Survey || MIS || align=right | 3.9 km || 
|-id=949 bgcolor=#E9E9E9
| 218949 ||  || — || February 27, 2008 || Kitt Peak || Spacewatch || — || align=right | 2.1 km || 
|-id=950 bgcolor=#d6d6d6
| 218950 ||  || — || February 29, 2008 || Kitt Peak || Spacewatch || — || align=right | 2.9 km || 
|-id=951 bgcolor=#fefefe
| 218951 ||  || — || February 26, 2008 || Mount Lemmon || Mount Lemmon Survey || V || align=right | 1.0 km || 
|-id=952 bgcolor=#fefefe
| 218952 ||  || — || February 29, 2008 || Catalina || CSS || — || align=right | 1.6 km || 
|-id=953 bgcolor=#fefefe
| 218953 ||  || — || February 26, 2008 || Mount Lemmon || Mount Lemmon Survey || — || align=right | 1.4 km || 
|-id=954 bgcolor=#E9E9E9
| 218954 ||  || — || March 1, 2008 || Kitt Peak || Spacewatch || MRX || align=right | 1.5 km || 
|-id=955 bgcolor=#E9E9E9
| 218955 ||  || — || March 2, 2008 || Kitt Peak || Spacewatch || MRX || align=right | 1.4 km || 
|-id=956 bgcolor=#fefefe
| 218956 ||  || — || March 3, 2008 || Catalina || CSS || MAS || align=right | 1.2 km || 
|-id=957 bgcolor=#fefefe
| 218957 ||  || — || March 4, 2008 || Kitt Peak || Spacewatch || — || align=right data-sort-value="0.94" | 940 m || 
|-id=958 bgcolor=#E9E9E9
| 218958 ||  || — || March 4, 2008 || Mount Lemmon || Mount Lemmon Survey || MRX || align=right | 1.6 km || 
|-id=959 bgcolor=#d6d6d6
| 218959 ||  || — || March 7, 2008 || Mount Lemmon || Mount Lemmon Survey || EUP || align=right | 5.5 km || 
|-id=960 bgcolor=#E9E9E9
| 218960 ||  || — || March 9, 2008 || Socorro || LINEAR || — || align=right | 2.5 km || 
|-id=961 bgcolor=#fefefe
| 218961 ||  || — || March 7, 2008 || Mount Lemmon || Mount Lemmon Survey || V || align=right data-sort-value="0.98" | 980 m || 
|-id=962 bgcolor=#E9E9E9
| 218962 ||  || — || March 11, 2008 || Mount Lemmon || Mount Lemmon Survey || — || align=right | 3.5 km || 
|-id=963 bgcolor=#fefefe
| 218963 ||  || — || March 5, 2008 || Mount Lemmon || Mount Lemmon Survey || — || align=right | 1.4 km || 
|-id=964 bgcolor=#fefefe
| 218964 ||  || — || March 27, 2008 || Kitt Peak || Spacewatch || V || align=right data-sort-value="0.88" | 880 m || 
|-id=965 bgcolor=#d6d6d6
| 218965 ||  || — || March 27, 2008 || Kitt Peak || Spacewatch || — || align=right | 3.7 km || 
|-id=966 bgcolor=#E9E9E9
| 218966 ||  || — || March 27, 2008 || Kitt Peak || Spacewatch || — || align=right | 1.4 km || 
|-id=967 bgcolor=#d6d6d6
| 218967 ||  || — || March 27, 2008 || Kitt Peak || Spacewatch || — || align=right | 3.4 km || 
|-id=968 bgcolor=#fefefe
| 218968 ||  || — || March 28, 2008 || Kitt Peak || Spacewatch || NYS || align=right data-sort-value="0.98" | 980 m || 
|-id=969 bgcolor=#fefefe
| 218969 ||  || — || March 28, 2008 || Mount Lemmon || Mount Lemmon Survey || FLO || align=right data-sort-value="0.93" | 930 m || 
|-id=970 bgcolor=#d6d6d6
| 218970 ||  || — || March 28, 2008 || Kitt Peak || Spacewatch || — || align=right | 3.7 km || 
|-id=971 bgcolor=#fefefe
| 218971 ||  || — || March 28, 2008 || Mount Lemmon || Mount Lemmon Survey || NYS || align=right | 1.3 km || 
|-id=972 bgcolor=#d6d6d6
| 218972 ||  || — || March 28, 2008 || Mount Lemmon || Mount Lemmon Survey || — || align=right | 3.4 km || 
|-id=973 bgcolor=#E9E9E9
| 218973 ||  || — || March 28, 2008 || Mount Lemmon || Mount Lemmon Survey || AGN || align=right | 1.8 km || 
|-id=974 bgcolor=#fefefe
| 218974 ||  || — || March 29, 2008 || Catalina || CSS || — || align=right | 1.4 km || 
|-id=975 bgcolor=#fefefe
| 218975 ||  || — || March 28, 2008 || Mount Lemmon || Mount Lemmon Survey || NYS || align=right data-sort-value="0.92" | 920 m || 
|-id=976 bgcolor=#E9E9E9
| 218976 ||  || — || March 30, 2008 || Kitt Peak || Spacewatch || PAD || align=right | 2.3 km || 
|-id=977 bgcolor=#fefefe
| 218977 ||  || — || March 31, 2008 || Kitt Peak || Spacewatch || MAS || align=right data-sort-value="0.95" | 950 m || 
|-id=978 bgcolor=#d6d6d6
| 218978 ||  || — || March 31, 2008 || Kitt Peak || Spacewatch || KOR || align=right | 2.2 km || 
|-id=979 bgcolor=#E9E9E9
| 218979 ||  || — || March 29, 2008 || Kitt Peak || Spacewatch || — || align=right | 1.7 km || 
|-id=980 bgcolor=#E9E9E9
| 218980 ||  || — || March 30, 2008 || Catalina || CSS || MAR || align=right | 1.8 km || 
|-id=981 bgcolor=#d6d6d6
| 218981 ||  || — || March 29, 2008 || Kitt Peak || Spacewatch || — || align=right | 3.3 km || 
|-id=982 bgcolor=#E9E9E9
| 218982 ||  || — || April 5, 2008 || Catalina || CSS || MRX || align=right | 1.7 km || 
|-id=983 bgcolor=#d6d6d6
| 218983 ||  || — || April 6, 2008 || Mount Lemmon || Mount Lemmon Survey || EOS || align=right | 2.7 km || 
|-id=984 bgcolor=#fefefe
| 218984 ||  || — || April 7, 2008 || Mount Lemmon || Mount Lemmon Survey || V || align=right data-sort-value="0.93" | 930 m || 
|-id=985 bgcolor=#E9E9E9
| 218985 ||  || — || April 11, 2008 || Kitt Peak || Spacewatch || — || align=right | 2.0 km || 
|-id=986 bgcolor=#d6d6d6
| 218986 ||  || — || April 5, 2008 || Črni Vrh || Črni Vrh || — || align=right | 4.6 km || 
|-id=987 bgcolor=#d6d6d6
| 218987 Heidenhain ||  ||  || April 26, 2008 || Gaisberg || R. Gierlinger || — || align=right | 3.3 km || 
|-id=988 bgcolor=#d6d6d6
| 218988 ||  || — || April 24, 2008 || Kitt Peak || Spacewatch || — || align=right | 3.9 km || 
|-id=989 bgcolor=#d6d6d6
| 218989 ||  || — || April 24, 2008 || Catalina || CSS || — || align=right | 4.4 km || 
|-id=990 bgcolor=#fefefe
| 218990 ||  || — || April 25, 2008 || Kitt Peak || Spacewatch || SUL || align=right | 2.9 km || 
|-id=991 bgcolor=#E9E9E9
| 218991 ||  || — || April 25, 2008 || Kitt Peak || Spacewatch || — || align=right | 1.6 km || 
|-id=992 bgcolor=#E9E9E9
| 218992 ||  || — || April 26, 2008 || Kitt Peak || Spacewatch || — || align=right | 2.3 km || 
|-id=993 bgcolor=#E9E9E9
| 218993 ||  || — || April 28, 2008 || Kitt Peak || Spacewatch || — || align=right | 1.7 km || 
|-id=994 bgcolor=#E9E9E9
| 218994 ||  || — || April 28, 2008 || Kitt Peak || Spacewatch || — || align=right | 3.2 km || 
|-id=995 bgcolor=#E9E9E9
| 218995 ||  || — || April 26, 2008 || Mount Lemmon || Mount Lemmon Survey || HNA || align=right | 2.6 km || 
|-id=996 bgcolor=#d6d6d6
| 218996 ||  || — || April 27, 2008 || Mount Lemmon || Mount Lemmon Survey || CHA || align=right | 2.4 km || 
|-id=997 bgcolor=#d6d6d6
| 218997 ||  || — || April 28, 2008 || Mount Lemmon || Mount Lemmon Survey || — || align=right | 5.0 km || 
|-id=998 bgcolor=#E9E9E9
| 218998 Navi ||  ||  || May 3, 2008 || Marly || P. Kocher || — || align=right | 1.4 km || 
|-id=999 bgcolor=#E9E9E9
| 218999 ||  || — || May 3, 2008 || Kitt Peak || Spacewatch || — || align=right | 3.1 km || 
|-id=000 bgcolor=#d6d6d6
| 219000 ||  || — || May 4, 2008 || Kitt Peak || Spacewatch || — || align=right | 4.2 km || 
|}

References

External links 
 Discovery Circumstances: Numbered Minor Planets (215001)–(220000) (IAU Minor Planet Center)

0218